= Luna =

Luna commonly refers to:

- Earth's Moon, named "Luna" in Latin, Spanish and other languages
- Luna (goddess), the ancient Roman personification of the Moon
- Luna (name), including a list of people and characters with this given name and surname
- Luna marble, the ancient Roman term for Carrara marble

Luna may also refer to:

== Places ==
=== Philippines ===
- Luna, Apayao
- Luna, Isabela
- Luna, La Union
- Luna, San Jose

=== Romania ===
- Luna, Negrești-Oaș town, Satu Mare County
- Luna, Cluj
- Luna de Jos, Dăbâca Commune, Cluj County
- Luna de Sus, Florești, Cluj
- Luna River

=== United States ===
- Luna, Arkansas
- Luna, Missouri
- Luna, Minnesota
- Luna, New Mexico
- Luna County, New Mexico
- Luna Island, in Niagara Falls, New York
- Luna Lake (Arizona), a natural body of water
- Luna Pier, Michigan, a city

=== Other places ===
- Luna (Etruria), a city in ancient Etruria (now Italy) destroyed by the Arabs in 1016
- Luna River (Spain), tributary of Órbigo
- Luna, Aragon, Spain
- Luna, Rajasthan, India
- Luna forest, on the north bank of the Danube, according to Ptolemy
- Luna Peak (disambiguation)
- Luna Street, Philippines
- Roverè della Luna, a commune in Italy
- Luna, former name of Louny, a town in the Czech Republic
- LUNA Analog Facility, a lunar analogue facility in Cologne, Germany

== Arts, entertainment and media ==
=== Fictional entities ===
- Luna (comics), in comic books published by Marvel Comics
- Luna, a class of starship in Star Trek: Titan
- Luna, a moon and character in children's TV series Let's Go Luna!

=== Film, television and radio ===
- Luna (1965 film), a Soviet popular science and science fiction film
- La Luna (1979 film), an Italian film by Bernardo Bertolucci
- Luna, a 1995 Spanish film by Alejandro Amenábar
- Luna, a 2014 British film by Dave McKean
- Luna (2017 film), written and directed by Khaled Kaissar
- Luna (TV series), a 1983-1984 UK children's TV show
- Luna (XM), XM Radio channel 95
- Luna radio, the US FM radio station KLNN
- Radio Luna, a radio station in Montenegro
- Rádio Luna, a defunct Portuguese radio station
- TV Luna, a defunct Slovak television channel

=== Literature ===
- Luna (Odier novel), a 1979 novel by Delacorta
- Luna (Peters novel), 2004, by Julie Anne Peters
- Luna: New Moon, a 2015 novel by Ian McDonald

=== Music ===
==== Performers ====
- Luna (1970s American band), a 1970s rock and roll band from Boston, Massachusetts
- Luna (1980s Serbian band), a 1980s post-punk/gothic rock band from Novi Sad, Serbia
- Luna (1990s American band), an alternative rock band from New York City, New York
- Luna (1990s Serbian band), a male/female pop group from Serbia
- Luna (Polish singer) (born 1999), a female soloist from Poland
- Luna (South Korean singer) (born 1993), member of South Korean girl group f(x)
- Luna (Ukrainian singer) (born 1990), pop singer and songwriter

==== Albums ====
- Luna (The Aliens album), 2008
- Luna (Ana Gabriel album), 1993
- Luna (Faun album), 2014
- Luna (National Product album), 2007
- Luna, by Anna Lapwood, 2023
- Luna, by Claudia Acuña, 2004
- Luna, by Tomasz Budzyński, 2008

==== Songs ====
- "Luna" (Beni Arashiro song)
- "Luna" (Eddy Lover song), 2008
- "Luna" (Feid and ATL Jacob song), 2023
- "Luna" (Gianni Togni song), 1980
- "Luna", by Alessandro Safina, 2000
- "Luna", by Ana Gabriel from Luna, 1993
- "Luna", by Arisa Mizuki from Arisa, 1991
- "Luna", by Bombay Bicycle Club from So Long, See You Tomorrow, 2014
- "Luna", by Gianluigi Di Franco, 1988
- "Luna", by Hayley Kiyoko from Panorama, 2022
- "Luna", by Invent Animate from Everchanger, 2014
- "Luna", by Juanes from Un Día Normal, 2002
- "Luna", by Oneus from Blood Moon, 2021
- "Luna", by Moonspell from Memorial, 2006
- "Luna", by Peso Pluma and Junior H from Génesis, 2023
- "Luna", by The Smashing Pumpkins from Siamese Dream, 1993
- "Luna", by Tom Petty and The Heartbreakers from their eponymous album, 1976
- "Luna", by Twelve Foot Ninja from Silent Machine, 2012
- "Luna", by Will Haven from VII, 2023
- "Luna", by Zoé from Reptilectric, 2008
- "Lhuna", by Coldplay and Kylie Minogue, 2008
- "La Luna" (song) by Belinda Carlisle, 1989

=== Other uses in arts and entertainment ===
- Luna (sculpture), by Ellen Tykeson in Eugene, Oregon, U.S.

== Businesses and brands ==
- Luna bar, an energy bar marketed to women by Clif Bar & Co.
- Luna Guitars, a guitar manufacturer
- Luna Innovations, a company based in Roanoke, Virginia, US
- Luna Lounge, a former bar in Manhattan, New York, U.S.
- Luna Park, various amusement parks
- Luna Publications, a literary publishing company in Toronto, Ontario, Canada

== People ==
- Luna (footballer) (born 1971), Spanish former professional footballer
- Luna (Polish singer) (born 1999), pop singer and songwriter
- Luna (South Korean singer) (born 1993), member of South Korean girl group f(x)
- Luna (Ukrainian singer) (born 1990), pop singer and songwriter

== Science and technology ==
=== Biology ===
- L98 Luna (orca), lost orca calf who lived in Nootka Sound between 2001 and 2006
- Luna (tree), a California redwood tree
- Luna moth, (Actias luna) a lime-green North American silk moth

=== Computing and telecommunication ===
- Luna (cryptocurrency)
- Luna (theme), the codename for the default theme of Windows XP
- LUNA, a computer product line of OMRON Tateishi Electric
- Nokia 8600 Luna, a mobile phone
- Amazon Luna, gaming service
- Luna, a digital audio workstation developed by Universal Audio

== Transportation ==
- Luna (rocket), carrier rockets used by the Soviet Union
- Luna (tugboat), a historic US tugboat
- Luna (yacht)
- Luna programme, a series of Soviet uncrewed space missions
- Luna X 2000, a German unmanned aerial vehicle
- Kinetic Luna, a moped in India
- MV Luna, a German passenger ship
- 2K6 Luna, a short-range Soviet ballistic missile
- 9K52 Luna-M, also known as FROG-7, a Soviet artillery rocket

== Other uses ==
- Luna, a type of small vessel which holds the Host in a monstrance
- Luna language, a Bantu language of the Democratic Republic of the Congo
- Symboli Rudolf, a Japanese racehorse that had the stable name "Luna"

== See also ==
- La Luna (disambiguation)
- La Lunatica, in the Marvel Comics universe
- Luna Luna, German folk rock band
- Loona (disambiguation)
- Luna City (disambiguation)
- Lunacy (disambiguation)
- Lunae, a Spanish pop group
- Lunamaria Hawke from Gundam Seed Destiny
- Luna Park (disambiguation)
- Lunas (disambiguation)
- Lunatic
- Lune (disambiguation)
