= Padang Serai (federal constituency) =

Federal constituency of Kedah, Malaysia

Padang Serai (P017)
Kedah constituency

Federal constituency
- Legislature: Dewan Rakyat
- MP: Azman Nasrudin; PN
- Constituency created: 1974
- First contested: 1974
- Last contested: 2022

Demographics
- Population (2020): 261,937
- Electors (2023): 135,535
- Area (km²): 343
- Pop. density (per km²): 763.7

Padang Serai is a federal constituency in Kulim District, Kedah, Malaysia, that has been represented in the Dewan Rakyat since 1974.

The federal constituency was created in the 1974 redistribution and is mandated to return a single member to the Dewan Rakyat under the first past the post voting system.

== Demographics ==
https://live.chinapress.com.my/ge15/parliament/KEDAH

Ethnic breakdown of Padang Serai's electorate as of 2022
1. Malay (62.9%)
2. Indian (19.1%)
3. Chinese (17.7%)
4. Other ethnicities (0.30%)

As of 2020, Padang Serai has a population of 261,937 people.

Age breakdown of Padang Serai's electorate as of 2022
1. 18-20 (9.00%)
2. 21-29 (26.6%)
3. 30-39 (20.1%)
4. 40-49 (16.2%)
5. 50-59 (13.9%)
6. 60-69 (9.01%)
7. 70-79 (3.76%)
8. 80-89 (1.19%)
9. above 90 (0.25%)
Gender breakdown of Padang Serai's electorate as of 2022
1. Male (49.0%)
2. Female (51.0%)

== History ==
=== Polling districts ===
According to the federal gazette issued on 18 July 2023, the Padang Serai constituency is divided into 43 polling districts.

State constituency	Polling Districts	Code	Location
Merbau Pulas (N33)	Guar Lobak	017/33/01	SK Guar Lobak
Merbau Pulas (N33)	Sidam Kanan	017/33/02	Maktab Mahmud Kulim
Merbau Pulas (N33)	Kuala Sedim	017/33/03	SMK Sungai Karangan
Merbau Pulas (N33)	Pekan Merbau Pulas	017/33/04	SJK (C) Aik Chee
Merbau Pulas (N33)	Kampung Jemerli	017/33/05	SK Merbau Pulas
Merbau Pulas (N33)	Bagan Sena	017/33/06	SK Labu Besar
Merbau Pulas (N33)	Sungai Karangan	017/33/07	SJK (C) Hua Min
Merbau Pulas (N33)	Padang Meiha	017/33/08	SK Bukit Selarong
Merbau Pulas (N33)	Ladang Padang Meiha	017/33/09	SK Sungai Karangan
Merbau Pulas (N33)	Batu Puteh	017/33/10	SK Pagar Museh
Merbau Pulas (N33)	Bukit Sedim	017/33/11	SK Ladang Bukit Sidim
Merbau Pulas (N33)	Kampung Bikan	017/33/12	SMK Labu Besar
Merbau Pulas (N33)	Kampung Jangkang	017/33/13	SMA Madrasah Ihsaniah
Merbau Pulas (N33)	Sungai Kob	017/33/14	SK Sungai Kob; SMK Taman Mutiara
Merbau Pulas (N33)	Kampung Sungai Ular	017/33/15	SK Sungai Ular
Merbau Pulas (N33)	Kulim High Tech	017/33/16	SJK (T) Ladang Bukit Mertajam; SK Taman Hi-Tech
Merbau Pulas (N33)	Padang China	017/33/17	SMK Kulim Hi-Tech
Merbau Pulas (N33)	Taman Perak	017/33/18	SK Jalan Paya Besar
Merbau Pulas (N33)	Taman Senangin	017/33/19	SMK Sultan Bandlishah
Merbau Pulas (N33)	Kampung Baru	017/33/20	SK Tunku Abdul Malik
Merbau Pulas (N33)	Jalan Sedang	017/33/21	SJK (C) Kelang Lama
Lunas (N34)	Pekan Padang Serai	017/34/01	SJK (C) Shang Cheng
Lunas (N34)	Jalan Baling	017/34/02	SMK Padang Serai
Lunas (N34)	Jalan Lunas	017/34/03	SMK Kulim
Lunas (N34)	Henrietta	017/34/04	SK Taman Mahsuri; SJK (T) Ladang Henrietta; SK Taman Ria
Lunas (N34)	Victoria	017/34/05	SJK (T) Ladang Victoria
Lunas (N34)	Naga Lilit	017/34/06	SK Permatang Tok Dik
Lunas (N34)	Sungai Seluang	017/34/07	SK Sungai Seluang
Lunas (N34)	Batu Enam	017/34/08	SMK Lunas
Lunas (N34)	Kampung Baru Lunas	017/34/09	SJK (T) Ladang Wellesley
Lunas (N34)	Pekan Lunas	017/34/10	SK Lunas Jaya
Lunas (N34)	Taman Sejahtera	017/34/11	SJK (C) Hwa Min
Lunas (N34)	Paya Besar	017/34/12	SMK Jalan Paya Besar
Lunas (N34)	Taman Lobak	017/34/13	SMK Tunku Panglima Besar
Lunas (N34)	Sungai Limau	017/34/14	SK Sri Limau
Lunas (N34)	Kampung Keladi	017/34/15	SK Keladi
Lunas (N34)	Taman Selasih	017/34/16	SMK Taman Selasih
Lunas (N34)	Simpang Tiga Keladi	017/34/17	SMK Keladi
Lunas (N34)	Kampung Dusun	017/34/18	SMK Keladi
Lunas (N34)	Kelang Sago	017/34/19	SJK (C) Chio Min (A); SJK (C) Chio Min (B)
Lunas (N34)	Bandar Putra	017/34/20	SK Air Merah
Lunas (N34)	Taman Angsana	017/34/21	SMK Air Merah
Lunas (N34)	Taman Semarak	017/34/22	SK Taman Selasih

=== Representation history ===
Members of Parliament for Padang Serai
Parliament	No	Years	Member	Party	Vote Share
Constituency created from Kulim Utara and Kulim-Bandar Bahru
4th	P014	1974–1978	Lim Kiam Hoon (林建云)	BN (MCA)	Uncontested
5th	P014	1978–1982	Lim Kiam Hoon (林建云)	BN (MCA)	14,579; 64.86%
6th	P014	1982–1986	Tan Kok Hooi (陈国辉)	BN (MCA)	18,043; 71.79%
7th	P015	1986–1990	Chew Kam Hoy (周锦海)	BN (MCA)	19,246; 69.82%
8th	P015	1990–1995	Lim Lay Hoon (林丽云)	BN (MCA)	19,157; 61.45%
9th	P017	1995–1999	Lim Lay Hoon (林丽云)	BN (MCA)	27,855; 69.07%
10th	P017	1999–2004	Lim Bee Kau (林美娇)	BN (MCA)	27,395; 60.32%
11th	P017	2004–2008	Lim Bee Kau (林美娇)	BN (MCA)	26,269; 62.22%
12th	P017	2008–2011	Gobalakrishnan Nagapan (கோபாலகிருஷ்ணன் நாகப்பன்)	PR (PKR)	28,774; 62.81%
12th	P017	2011–2013	Gobalakrishnan Nagapan (கோபாலகிருஷ்ணன் நாகப்பன்)	Independent	28,774; 62.81%
13th	P017	2013–2015	Surendran Nagarajan (நா. சுரேந்திரன்)	PR (PKR)	34,151; 54.07%
13th	P017	2015–2018	Surendran Nagarajan (நா. சுரேந்திரன்)	PH (PKR)	34,151; 54.07%
14th	P017	2018–2022	Karupaiya Mutusami (கருப்பையா முத்துசாமி)	PH (PKR)	31,724; 45.27%
15th	P017	2022–present	Azman Nasrudin (عزمان نصرالدين)	PN (BERSATU)	51,637; 56.49%

=== State constituency ===
Parliamentary constituency	State constituency						
Parliamentary constituency	1955–1959*	1959–1974	1974–1986	1986–1995	1995–2004	2004–2018	2018–present
Padang Serai					Kuala Ketil		
Padang Serai			Lunas				
Padang Serai			Merbau Pulas				

=== Historical boundaries ===
State Constituency	Area				
State Constituency	1974	1984	1994	2003	2018
Kuala Ketil			FELCRA Bukit Hijau; Gunung Inas; Kampung Ulu Bakai; Kuala Ketil; Kuala Lesong		
Lunas	FELDA Gunung Bongsu; Karangan; Keladi; Padang Serai; Sidam Kanan	Kampung Baru Batu 8; Karangan; Keladi; Padang Serai; Sidam Kanan	Keladi; Lunas; Naga Lilit; Taman Angsana; Taman Selasih		Keladi; Lunas; Padang Serai; Taman Angsana; Taman Selasih
Merbau Pulas	Desa Aman; FELCRA Bukit Hijau; Karangan; Labu Besar; Merbau Pulas	Desa Aman; FELCRA Bukit Hijau; Kampung Ulu Bakai; Labu Besar; Merbau Pulas	Padang Serai; Karangan; Labu Besar; Merbau Pulas; Sidam Kanan		Kampung Tanjung Belit; Karangan; Labu Besar; Merbau Pulas; Sidam Kanan

=== Current state assembly members ===
No.	State Constituency	Member	Coalition (Party)
N33	Merbau Pulas	Siti Ashah Ghazali	PN (PAS)
N34	Lunas	Khairul Anuar Ramli	PN (BERSATU)

=== Local governments & postcodes ===
No.	State Constituency	Local Government	Postcode
N33	Merbau Pulas	Kulim Municipal Council; Kulim Hi-Tech Industrial Park Local Authority (Kulim Hi-Tech Park area)	09000, 09010, 09020 Kulim; 09400, 09410 Padang Serai; 09600 Lunas; 09700 Karangan
N34	Lunas	Kulim Municipal Council	09000, 09010, 09020 Kulim; 09400, 09410 Padang Serai; 09600 Lunas; 09700 Karangan

== Election results ==
Malaysian general by-election, 7 December 2022 Upon the death of the candidate, Karupaiya Muthusami
Party	Candidate	Votes	%	∆%
PN	Azman Nasrudin	51,637	56.49	▲56.49
PH	Mohamad Sofee Razak	35,377	38.70	▲38.70
BN	Sivarraajh Chandran	2,983	3.26	▼18.78
Independent	Sreanandha Rao	846	0.93	▲0.93
PEJUANG	Hamzah Abdul Rahman	424	0.46	▲0.46
Heritage	Mohd Bakri Hashim	149	0.16	▲0.16
Total valid votes		91,416	100.00	
Total rejected ballots		753		
Unreturned ballots		133		
Turnout		92,302	68.95	▼14.93
Registered electors		133,867		
Majority		16,260	17.79	▲5.21
PN gain from PKR		Swing		?
Source(s) https://lom.agc.gov.my/ilims/upload/portal/akta/outputp/1753260/PUB%20606%20(2022).pdf

Malaysian general election, 2018
Party	Candidate	Votes	%	∆%
PKR	Karupaiya Mutusami	31,724	45.27	▼8.80
PAS	Muhamad Sobri Osman	22,911	32.69	▲32.69
BN	Leong Yong Kong	15,449	22.04	▼18.67
Total valid votes		70,084	100.00	
Total rejected ballots		827		
Unreturned ballots		246		
Turnout		71,157	83.88	▼3.28
Registered electors		84,834		
Majority		8,813	12.58	▼0.78
PKR hold		Swing		
Source(s) "His Majesty's Government Gazette - Notice of Contested Election, Parliament for the State of Kedah [P.U. (B) 233/2018]" (PDF). Attorney General's Chambers of Malaysia. 3 May 2018. "Federal Government Gazette - Results of Contested Election and Statements of the Poll after the Official Addition of Votes, Parliamentary Constituencies for the State of Kedah [P.U. (B) 307/2018]" (PDF). Attorney General's Chambers of Malaysia. 28 May 2018.

Malaysian general election, 2013
Party	Candidate	Votes	%	∆%
PKR	Surendran Nagarajan	34,151	54.07	▼8.74
BN	Heng Seai Kie	25,714	40.71	▲3.52
Pan-Malaysian Islamic Front	Hamidi Abu Hassan	2,630	4.16	▲4.16
Independent	Gobalakrishnan Nagapan	390	0.62	▲0.62
Independent	Othman Wawi	279	0.44	▲0.44
Total valid votes		63,164	100.00	
Total rejected ballots		1,223		
Unreturned ballots		197		
Turnout		64,584	87.16	▲7.58
Registered electors		74,095		
Majority		8,437	13.36	▼12.26
PKR hold		Swing		
Source(s) "Federal Government Gazette - Notice of Contested Election, Parliament for the State of Kedah [P.U. (B) 170/2013]" (PDF). Attorney General's Chambers of Malaysia. 26 April 2013. Archived from the original (PDF) on 2019-12-29. "Federal Government Gazette - Results of Contested Election and Statements of the Poll after the Official Addition of Votes, Parliamentary Constituencies for the State of Kedah [P.U. (B) 211/2013]" (PDF). Attorney General's Chambers of Malaysia. 22 May 2013.

Malaysian general election, 2008
Party	Candidate	Votes	%	∆%
PKR	Gobalakrishnan Nagapan	28,774	62.81	▲25.03
BN	Boey Chin Gan	17,036	37.19	▼25.03
Total valid votes		45,810	100.00	
Total rejected ballots		1,259		
Unreturned ballots		55		
Turnout		47,124	79.58	▼0.73
Registered electors		59,218		
Majority		11,738	25.62	▲1.18
PKR gain from BN		Swing		?

Malaysian general election, 2004
Party	Candidate	Votes	%	∆%
BN	Lim Bee Kau	26,269	62.22	▲1.90
PKR	Saifuddin Nasution Ismail	15,953	37.78	▼1.90
Total valid votes		42,222	100.00	
Total rejected ballots		1,075		
Unreturned ballots		10		
Turnout		43,307	80.31	▲7.56
Registered electors		53,924		
Majority		10,316	24.44	▲3.80
BN hold		Swing		

Malaysian general election, 1999
Party	Candidate	Votes	%	∆%
BN	Lim Bee Kau	27,395	60.32	▼8.75
PKR	Saifuddin Nasution Ismail	18,023	39.68	▲39.68
Total valid votes		45,418	100.00	
Total rejected ballots		1,349		
Unreturned ballots		11		
Turnout		46,778	72.75	▲2.18
Registered electors		64,299		
Majority		9,372	20.64	▼20.42
BN hold		Swing		

Malaysian general election, 1995
Party	Candidate	Votes	%	∆%
BN	Lim Lay Hoon	27,844	69.07	▲7.62
S46	Ahmad Awang	11,291	28.01	▲28.01
Independent	Tan Kee Chye	1,177	2.92	▲2.92
Total valid votes		40,312	100.00	
Total rejected ballots		2,090		
Unreturned ballots		10		
Turnout		42,412	70.57	▼3.10
Registered electors		60,099		
Majority		16,553	41.06	▲0.96
BN hold		Swing		

Malaysian general election, 1990
Party	Candidate	Votes	%	∆%
BN	Lim Lay Hoon	19,157	61.45	▼8.37
PAS	Abdul Wahab Awang Junus	6,657	21.35	▼8.83
DAP	Karuppalah Ramasamy	5,360	17.19	▲17.19
Total valid votes		31,174	100.00	
Total rejected ballots		1,314		
Unreturned ballots		0		
Turnout		32,488	73.67	▲0.63
Registered electors		44,102		
Majority		12,500	40.10	▲0.46
BN hold		Swing		

Malaysian general election, 1986
Party	Candidate	Votes	%	∆%
BN	Chew Kam Hoy	19,246	69.82	▼1.97
PAS	Mohd Radzi Hussain	8,320	30.18	▲5.58
Total valid votes		27,566	100.00	
Total rejected ballots		1,015		
Unreturned ballots		0		
Turnout		28,581	73.04	▼4.15
Registered electors		39,128		
Majority		10,926	39.64	▼7.55
BN hold		Swing		

Malaysian general election, 1982
Party	Candidate	Votes	%	∆%
BN	Tan Kok Hooi	18,043	71.79	▲6.93
PAS	Khatib Shorbaini Hassan	6,183	24.60	▼10.54
Independent	Ramley Ismail	906	3.60	▲3.60
Total valid votes		25,132	100.00	
Total rejected ballots		966		
Unreturned ballots		0		
Turnout		26,098	77.19	▼1.65
Registered electors		33,812		
Majority		11,860	47.19	▲17.47
BN hold		Swing		

Malaysian general election, 1978
Party	Candidate	Votes	%	∆%
BN	Lim Ah Ying @ Lim Kiam Hoon	14,579	64.86	▲64.86
PAS	Khatib Shorbaini Hassan	7,897	35.14	▲35.14
Total valid votes		22,476	100.00	
Total rejected ballots		737		
Unreturned ballots		0		
Turnout		23,213	78.84	
Registered electors		29,444		
Majority		6,682	29.72	
BN hold		Swing		

Malaysian general election, 1974
Party	Candidate	Votes	%
On the nomination day, Lim Kiam Hoon won uncontested.
BN	Lim Ah Ying @ Lim Kiam Hoon		
Total valid votes			100.00
Total rejected ballots			
Unreturned ballots			
Turnout			
Registered electors		24,542	
Majority			
This was a new constituency created.
