= Lunarian =

Lunarian may refer to:

- Supposed inhabitants of the Moon in fiction
- A fictional race of the Final Fantasy IV video game
- A fictional race of the anime/manga One Piece
- A fictional race in the Touhou Project franchise
- Lunarian (album), a 2021 Donovan album

== See also ==
- Luna (disambiguation)
- Lunar (disambiguation)
- Lunatic (disambiguation)
- Moon people (disambiguation)
