= Lunatic (disambiguation) =

"Lunatic" is a commonly used term for a person who is mentally ill, dangerous, foolish, unpredictable; a condition once called lunacy.

Lunatic may also refer to:

- Lunatic (Booba album), 2010
- Lunatic (Kongos album), 2012/14
- Lunatic (group), a French hip-hop duo, consisted of Ali and Booba
- Lunatic (novel), a 2009 novel by Ted Dekker
- Lunatic Lake, in Alaska, U.S.
- The Cornell Lunatic, a college humor magazine at Cornell University
- "Lunatic", a single by Gazebo
- "Lunatic", a song by Dolores O'Riordan from No Baggage
- "Lunatic", a song by Kevin Coyne from Dynamite Daze
- "Lunatic", a song by Static-X from Cult of Static
- Lunatics (painting), a painting by Odd Nerdrum
- Lunatics (TV series), a 2019 Australian web television series starring Chris Lilley

== See also ==
- Looney (disambiguation)
- Lunatic fringe (disambiguation)
- Lunacy (disambiguation)
- Norman the Lunatic, stage name for American professional Mike Shaw (1957–2010)
