= Extreme =

Extreme is a term referring to things above average, or overall radical things. Extreme may refer to:

== Science and mathematics ==
=== Mathematics ===
- Extreme point, a point in a convex set which does not lie in any open line segment joining two points in the set
- Maxima and minima, extremes on a mathematical function

=== Science ===
- Extremophile, an organism which thrives in or requires some "extreme" environment
- Extremes on Earth
- List of extrasolar planet extremes

== Politics ==
- Extremism, political ideologies or actions deemed outside the acceptable range
- The Extreme (Italy) or Historical Far Left, a left-wing parliamentary group in Italy 1867–1904

== Business ==
- Extreme Networks, a California-based networking hardware company
- Extreme Records, an Australia-based record label
- Extreme Associates, a California-based adult film studio

== Computer science ==
- Xtreme Mod, a peer-to-peer file sharing client for Windows

== Sports and entertainment ==
=== Sport ===
- Extreme sport
- Extreme Sports Channel A global sports and lifestyle brand dedicated to extreme sports and youth culture
- Los Angeles Xtreme, a defunct XFL franchise
- Buffalo eXtreme, an ABA franchise

=== Music ===
- Extreme metal, an umbrella term for a group of related heavy metal subgenres
- Extreme (band), an American band
  - Extreme (Extreme album), 1989
- Extreme (Molly Nilsson album), 2022
- Xtreme (group), a bachata duo
  - Xtreme (album), an album by Xtreme
- Extremes (album), an album by Collin Raye
- X-Treme, a stage name of Italian singer and producer Agostino Carollo

=== Other entertainment ===
- Extreme Sports Channel, a global TV channel dedicated to extreme sports and youth culture
- RTL CBS Extreme, a Southeast Asian TV channel simply known as "Extreme" prior to the rebranding as Blue Ant Extreme
- Extreme (1995 TV series), a 1995 American action series that aired on ABC
- Extreme Dinosaurs, an 1997 American animated television series
- Extreme Ghostbusters, an 1997 American animated television series
- Extreme (2009 TV series), a 2009 American television series that aired on the Travel Channel
- "Extreme" (CSI: Miami), a season two episode of CSI: Miami
- "Extreme" (Doctors), a 2004 television episode
- Xtreme (2021 film), a Spanish action film by Daniel Benmayor
- Xtreme (2025 film), an Indian Tamil-language suspense crime thriller film

== Literature ==
- The Extreme (novel), a 1998 Animorphs novel by K. A. Applegate
- Extremes (novel), by Kristine Kathryn Rusch
- Extreme Studios, a forerunner of the American comic book studio Image Comics
- Adam X the X-Treme, a character in the Marvel Comics universe
- Extreme, an autobiography by Sharon Osbourne

== Other uses ==
- Chevrolet Extreme, a name for the Chevrolet S-10 pickup truck
- Extrême, a pre-filled ice-cream cone brand by Nestlé

== See also ==
- Extremities (disambiguation)
- Lunatic fringe (disambiguation)
