= Ananthan Somasundaram =

Malaysian politician

Yang Berbahagia Dato' Ananthan Somasundaram DSDK SDK
- ஆனந்தன் சோமசுந்தரம்

Secretary-General of the Malaysian Indian Congress
- Incumbent
- Assumed office 7 August 2024
- President: Vigneswaran Sanasee
- Deputy President: Saravanan Murugan
- Preceded by: RT Rajasekaran

Senator

Elected by Kedah State Legislative Assembly
- In office 15 August 2017 – 14 August 2020
- Monarchs: Muhammad V (2017–2019); Abdullah (2019–2020)
- Prime Minister: Najib Razak (2017–2018); Mahathir Mohamad (2018–2020); Muhyiddin Yassin (2020–2020)

Personal details
- Born: Ananthan a/l Somasundaram Kulim, Kedah
- Party: Malaysian Indian Congress (MIC)
- Other political affiliations: Barisan Nasional (BN)
- Education: Universiti Putra Malaysia (Bachelor of Education); Universiti Sains Malaysia (Master of Education); Universiti Sains Malaysia (Ph.D in Educational Management and Leadership)

Ananthan s/o Somasundaram is a Malaysian politician who had served as a Senator from August 2017 to August 2020. He is currently the secretary-general of the Malaysian Indian Congress (MIC), a component party of the Barisan Nasional (BN) coalition.

== Political career ==
Ananthan Somasundaram was contested on Lunas state seat in 2008 and 2013 elections, however he was defeated by PKR candidate.

On 9 March 2022, Ananthan was appointed as Political Secretary to the Prime Minister Ismail Sabri Yaakob.

In the other hand, Ananthan also served as Board of Directors of the AIMST university.

== Election results ==
Kedah State Legislative Assembly
Year	Constituency	Candidate	Votes	Pct	Opponent(s)	Votes	Pct	Ballots cast	Majority	Turnout
2008	N34 Lunas	Ananthan Somasundaram (MIC)	7,513	29.64%	Mohammad Radzhi Salleh (PKR)	17,836	70.36%	25,711	10,323	79.29%
2013	N34 Lunas	Ananthan Somasundaram (MIC)	12,586	36.24%	Azman Nasrudin (PKR)	21,670	62.39%	35,125	9,084	86.73%
2013	N34 Lunas	Ananthan Somasundaram (MIC)	12,586	36.24%	Vasanthi Ramalingam (IND)	406	1.17%	35,125	9,084	86.73%
2013	N34 Lunas	Ananthan Somasundaram (MIC)	12,586	36.24%	Prebakarran Narayanan Nair (KITA)	71	0.20%	35,125	9,084	86.73%

== Honours ==
- Kedah
  - Knight Companion of the Order of Loyalty to the Royal House of Kedah (DSDK) – Dato' (2016)
  - Companion of the Order of Loyalty to the Royal House of Kedah (SDK) (2014)
