= Loona (disambiguation) =

Loona is a South Korean girl group formerly under Blockberry Creative.

Loona may also refer to:

- Loóna, a mobile app geared towards relaxation and sleep
- Loona (Punjabi epic), a Punjabi epic verse play written by Shiv Kumar Batalvi
- Loona (singer) (born 1974), Dutch singer, songwriter and dancer
- Loona, Estonia, a village in Western Estonia
- Loona, a character in the adult animated web-series Helluva Boss

== See also ==
- Luna (disambiguation)
