= Gobalakrishnan Nagapan =

Malaysian politician

Member of the Malaysian Parliament for Padang Serai
- In office 8 March 2008 – 5 May 2013
- Preceded by: Lim Bee Kau (BN–UMNO)
- Succeeded by: Surendran Nagarajan (PR–PKR)
- Majority: 11,738 (2008)

Personal details
- Born: 23 March 1960 (age 66) Sitiawan, Perak, Federation of Malaya (now Malaysia)
- Party: Malaysian Indian Congress (MIC) (1985–1998; 2017–present); Independent (2011–2017); Parti Keadilan Nasional (keADILan) (1999–2003); People's Justice Party (PKR) (2003–2011)
- Spouse: Vasanthi Ramalingam
- Children: 3
- Occupation: Politician
- Website: www.mppadangserai.com

Gobalakrishnan s/o Nagapan (born 23 March 1960), commonly referred to as N. Gobalakrishnan, is a Malaysian politician. He was the Member of the Parliament of Malaysia for the Padang Serai constituency in Kedah from 2008 to 2013. He was elected to the Parliament as a member of the People's Justice Party (PKR) in the opposition Pakatan Rakyat coalition, but in 2011 left the party to sit as an Independent. Gobalakrishnan on 8 May 2017 rejoined the Malaysian Indian Congress (MIC) after leaving it 18 years ago to join PKR.

== Personal life ==
Gobalakrishnan was born in 1960 in Sitiawan. He is married to Vasanthi Ramalingam, a former athlete, and has three children.

== Controversy ==
In September 2009, Gobalakrishnan was arrested for allegedly using criminal force to obstruct a police officer. He was found guilty and fined 3,000 ringgit. In December 2010, he spoke out against his party's leader, Anwar Ibrahim, suggesting that he make way for his daughter Nurul Izzah Anwar. He resigned from the party the following month to sit as an independent, announcing plans to form a non-governmental organisation. He recontested Padang Serai at the 2013 election as an independent, having unsuccessfully sought the nomination of the Barisan Nasional coalition. Without a party ticket he garnered less than one percent of the vote and lost his deposit.

In April 2019, the Putrajaya Court of Appeal ruled Gobalakrishnan has to pay RM150,000 in damages for defaming and RM5,000 in costs to lawyer and former Malaysian Bar president Manjeet Singh Dhillon.

== Election results ==
Parliament of Malaysia
Year	Constituency	Candidate	Votes	Pct	Opponent(s)	Votes	Pct	Ballots cast	Majority	Turnout
1999	P119 Telok Kemang	Gobalakrishnan Nagapan (DAP)^{1}	17,170	38.97%	Anpalagan Sami Reddy (MIC)	27,112	61.03%	46,149	9,942	68.69%
2004	P076 Telok Intan	Gobalakrishnan Nagapan (PKR)	6,128	18.12%	Mah Siew Keong (Gerakan)	18,870	55.78%	35,082	10,041	66.11%
2004	P076 Telok Intan	Gobalakrishnan Nagapan (PKR)	6,128	18.12%	Wu Him Ven (DAP)	8,829	26.10%	35,082	10,041	66.11%
2008	P017 Padang Serai	Gobalakrishnan Nagapan (PKR)	28,774	62.81%	Boey Chin Gan (MCA)	17,036	37.19%	47,124	11,738	79.58%
2013	P017 Padang Serai	Gobalakrishnan Nagapan (IND)	390	0.62%	Surendran Nagarajan (PKR)	34,151	54.07%	64,584	8,437	87.16%
2013	P017 Padang Serai	Gobalakrishnan Nagapan (IND)	390	0.62%	Heng Seai Kie (MCA)	25,714	40.71%	64,584	8,437	87.16%
2013	P017 Padang Serai	Gobalakrishnan Nagapan (IND)	390	0.62%	Hamidi Abu Hassan (BERJASA)	2,630	4.16%	64,584	8,437	87.16%
2013	P017 Padang Serai	Gobalakrishnan Nagapan (IND)	390	0.62%	Othman Wawi (IND)	279	0.44%	64,584	8,437	87.16%

Note: ^{1} Gobalakrishnan Nagapan is a member of keADILan, amid contested under the ticket of DAP in the 1999 election.
