= Extrema =

Extrema may refer to:

- Extrema (mathematics), maxima and minima values
- Extremities (disambiguation)
- Extrema, Minas Gerais, town in Brazil
- Extrema, Rondônia, town in Brazil
- Extrema (band), Italian thrash/groove metal band
