= Lunas =

Lunas is the name of several places:

- Lunas, Dordogne, France
- Lunas, Hérault, France
- Lunas, Kedah, Malaysia
- Lunas (state constituency)
