= Karupaiya Mutusami =

Malaysian politician (1953–2022)

Karupaiya Muthusami BAT PPN PPT PJK PPS PPA PJM
- கருப்பையா முத்துசாமி

Member of the Malaysian Parliament for Padang Serai
- In office 9 May 2018 – 16 November 2022
- Preceded by: Surendran Nagarajan (PH–PKR)
- Succeeded by: Azman Nasrudin (PN–BERSATU)
- Majority: 8,813 (2018)

Faction represented in Dewan Rakyat
- 2018–2022: Pakatan Harapan

Personal details
- Born: Karupaiya s/o Muthusami; 4 February 1953 Padang Serai, Kedah, Federation of Malaya
- Died: 16 November 2022 (aged 69) Kulim, Kedah, Malaysia
- Citizenship: Malaysian
- Party: People's Justice Party (PKR) (–2022)
- Other political affiliations: Pakatan Harapan (PH) (2015–2022)
- Occupation: Politician

Military service
- Allegiance: Malaysia
- Branch/service: Malaysian Army
- Rank: Warrant Officer I

Karupaiya s/o Muthusami (Tamil: கருப்பையா முத்துசாமி, romanized: Karuppaiyā muttucāmi, 4 February 1953 – 16 November 2022) was a Malaysian politician who served as the Member of Parliament (MP) for Padang Serai from May 2018 to his death in November 2022. He was a member and Division Chief of Padang Serai of the People's Justice Party (PKR), a component party of the Pakatan Harapan (PH) opposition coalition. He was also patron of both the Malaysian Indian Armed Forces (PERIM) and the Former Malaysian Armed Forces as well as member of the board of the Institute of Postgraduate Studies (IPS) of the Bukit Mertajam Tamil School.

== Personal life and death ==
On 16 November 2022, Karupaiya died from a heart attack while campaigning for the 2022 general election. He was seeking the second term as the Padang Serai MP by contesting in the election representing PH and PKR after serving the first from 2018 to his death in 2022 for four years. Later the same day, the Election Commission (EC) offered its condolences to his family while informing that the EC would hold a special meeting two days later on 18 November 2022, which was also a day prior to the election to decide on the dates of the Padang Serai election. He explained that the EC had received an Election Writ by the Managing Officer in Padang Serai over the death of Karupaiya.

== Election results ==
Parliament of Malaysia
Year	Constituency	Candidate	Votes	Pct	Opponent(s)	Votes	Pct	Ballots cast	Majority	Turnout
2018	P017 Padang Serai	Karupaiya Muthusami (PKR)	31,724	45.27%	Muhammad Sobri Osman (PAS)	22,911	32.69%	71,157	8,813	83.88%
2018	P017 Padang Serai	Karupaiya Muthusami (PKR)	31,724	45.27%	Leong Yong Kong (MCA)	15,449	22.04%	71,157	8,813	83.88%

== Honours ==
=== Honours of Malaysia ===
- Malaysia
  - Medal of the Order of the Defender of the Realm (PPN) (1983)
  - Recipient of the Loyal Service Medal (PPS)
  - Recipient of the General Service Medal (PPA)
- Malaysian Armed Forces
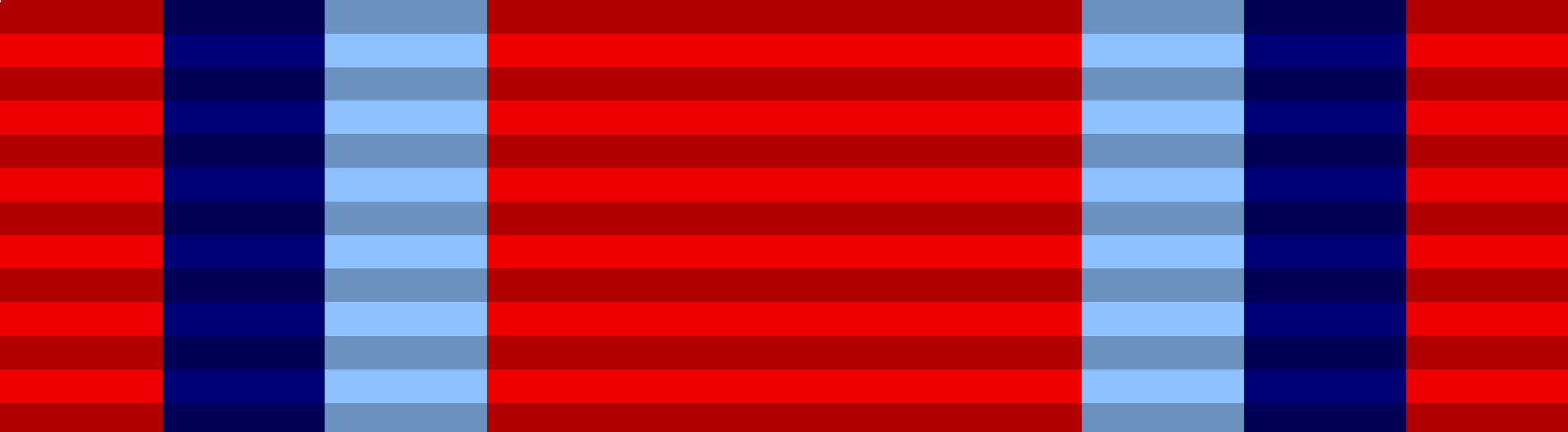
  - Herald of the Most Gallant Order of Military Service (BAT)
  - Recipient of the Malaysian Service Medal (PJM)
- Pahang
  - Recipient of the Meritorious Service Medal (PJK)
- Perak
  - Recipient of the Distinguished Conduct Medal (PPT) (1993)
