= La Luna =

La Luna may refer to:

- The moon in Italian, Occitan, and Spanish
- La Luna (Portland, Oregon), a defunct Portland, Oregon nightclub
- La Luna (1979 film), a film by Italian director Bernardo Bertolucci
- La Luna (2011 film), a short film from Pixar
- La Luna (2023 film), a film by Singaporean director M. Raihan Halim

== Music ==
- La Luna (Sarah Brightman album), a 2000 album by English soprano Sarah Brightman
- La Luna: Live in Concert, a 2001 Sarah Brightman concert inspired by that album
- La Luna (Holger Czukay album), a 2000 album by Holger Czukay
- "La Luna" (song), a 1989 song by Belinda Carlisle
- La luna (album), a 1975 album by Angelo Branduardi
- "La Luna", a 1982 song by Nova
- "La Luna", a 2012 song by Madness from the album Oui Oui, Si Si, Ja Ja, Da Da
- "La Luna", a 2012 song by Reks from REBELutionary
- "La Luna", a 2022 song by Ichillin'

== See also ==
- La Luna Sangre, a 2017-2018 Philippine television drama fantasy series of ABS-CBN
- Luna (disambiguation)
