= Siti Ashah Ghazali =

Malaysian politician

Yang Berhormat Ustazah Dato' Siti Ashah Ghazali DSDK AMK MLA
- سيتي عائشة غزالي

Member of the Kedah State Executive Council
- Incumbent
- Assumed office 21 August 2023 (Rural Development, Poverty and Human Development)
- Monarch: Sallehuddin
- Menteri Besar: Muhammad Sanusi Md Nor
- Preceded by: Herself
- Constituency: Merbau Pulas
- In office 20 May 2020 – 14 August 2023 (Rural and Human Development, Poverty Eradication)
- Monarch: Sallehuddin
- Menteri Besar: Muhammad Sanusi Md Nor
- Preceded by: Ismail Salleh (Rural); Halimaton Shaadiah Saad (Human Development and Poverty Eradication)
- Succeeded by: Herself
- Constituency: Merbau Pulas
- In office 12 March 2008 – 6 May 2013 (Woman Development and Welfare)
- Monarch: Abdul Halim
- Menteri Besar: Azizan Abdul Razak
- Preceded by: Khalidah Adibah Ayob (Woman Development); Saravanan Velia Udayar (Welfare)
- Succeeded by: Suraya Yaacob
- Constituency: Merbau Pulas

Member of the Kedah State Legislative Assembly for Merbau Pulas
- Incumbent
- Assumed office 8 March 2008
- Preceded by: Mohd Hadzir Ismail (BN–UMNO)
- Majority: 3,576 (2008); 633 (2013); 438 (2018); 19,285 (2023)

Personal details
- Born: Siti Ashah binti Ghazali; 3 October 1962 (age 64) Kedah, Federation of Malaya (now Malaysia)
- Party: Malaysian Islamic Party (PAS)
- Other political affiliations: Barisan Alternatif (BA) (1999–2004); Pakatan Rakyat (PR) (2008–2015); Gagasan Sejahtera (GS) (2016–2020); Perikatan Nasional (PN) (since 2020)
- Education: Universiti Teknologi Mara
- Occupation: Politician

Siti Ashah binti Ghazali (born 3 October 1962) is a Malaysian politician who has served as Member of the Kedah State Executive Council (EXCO) in the Perikatan Nasional (PN) state administration under Menteri Besar Muhammad Sanusi Md Nor since May 2020 and in the Pakatan Rakyat (PR) state administration under former Menteri Besar Azizan Abdul Razak from March 2008 to the collapse of the PR state administration in May 2013 as well as Member of the Kedah State Legislative Assembly (MLA) for Merbau Pulas since March 2008. She is a member of the Malaysian Islamic Party (PAS), a component party of the PN and formerly Gagasan Sejahtera (GS), PR and Barisan Alternatif (BA) coalitions.

== Education ==
She received her early education at Sekolah Kebangsaan Jeneri, Sik, from 1969 until 1971 before moving to Sekolah Kebangsaan Cemara, Jeniang. In 1973, she moved to Sekolah Kebangsaan Paya Mengkuang, Gurun, Kedah. She then continued her studies at the secondary level at Sekolah Menengah Agama Taufiqiah Khairiah Halimiah, Batu 16, Padang Lumat from 1975 to 1981. In 1988, she received the Diploma in Islamic Tasawwur from ILHAM.

== Career ==
- Religious Teacher in Sekolah Kebangsaan Permatang Tok Dik, Padang Serai, Kedah (1988-1985)
- Religious Teacher (Backup) in Sekolah Kebangsaan Bukit Selarong, Padang Serai, Kedah (1986)
- Member of Kedah State Executive Council 2008-2013
  - Chairman of the Woman Development and Welfare Committee
- Member of Kedah State Executive Council 2020–present
  - Chairman of the Rural, Human Development and Poverty Eradication Committee

== Election results ==
Kedah State Legislative Assembly
Year	Constituency	Candidate	Votes	Pct	Opponent(s)	Votes	Pct	Ballots cast	Majority	Turnout
2004	N33 Merbau Pulas	Siti Ashah Ghazali (PAS)	6,410	31.68%	Mohd Hadzir Ismail (UMNO)	13,825	68.32%	20,687	7,415	79.69%
2008	N33 Merbau Pulas	Siti Ashah Ghazali (PAS)	12,224	58.57%	Mohd Hadzir Ismail (UMNO)	8,648	41.43%	21,355	3,576	79.59%
2013	N33 Merbau Pulas	Siti Ashah Ghazali (PAS)	14,705	51.10%	Marlia Abd Latiff (UMNO)	14,072	48.90%	29,280	633	87.15%
2018	N33 Merbau Pulas	Siti Ashah Ghazali (PAS)	9,892	34.57%	Asmadi Abu Talib (UMNO)	9,454	33.04%	29,137	438	84.50%
2018	N33 Merbau Pulas	Siti Ashah Ghazali (PAS)	9,892	34.57%	Abd Razak Salleh (AMANAH)	9,267	32.39%	29,137	438	84.50%
2023	N33 Merbau Pulas	Siti Ashah Ghazali (PAS)	29,919	73.78%	Asmadi Abu Talib (UMNO)	10,634	26.22%	40,553	19,285	76.05%

== Honours ==
- Kedah
  - Knight Companion of the Order of Loyalty to the Royal House of Kedah (DSDK) – Dato' (2012)
  - Member of the Order of the Crown of Kedah (AMK) (2009)
