= Lunas-les-Châteaux =

- Commune
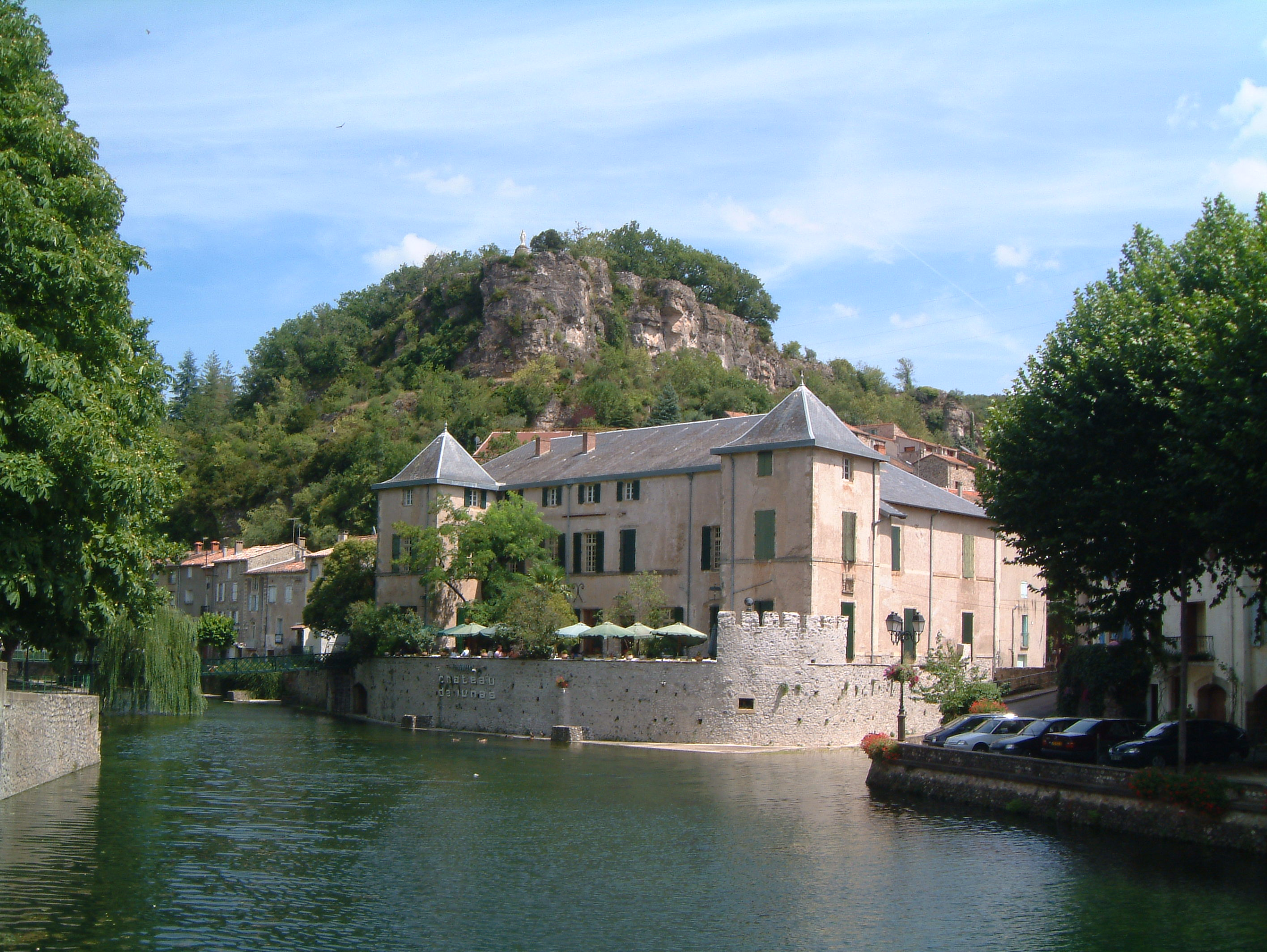
- Chateau of Lunas (restaurant)
- Location of Lunas-les-Châteaux
- Location within France Location within Occitanie
- Coordinates: 43°47′13″N 3°11′49″E
- Country: France
- Region: Occitania
- Department: Hérault
- Arrondissement: Béziers
- Canton: Clermont-l'Hérault
- Intercommunality: CC Grand Orb

Government
  - Mayor (2025–2026): Aurélien Manenc
- Area^{1}: 63.66 km^{2} (24.58 sq mi)
- Highest elevation: 768 m (2,520 ft)
- Lowest elevation: 234 m (768 ft)
- Population (2023): 832
  - Density: 13.1/km^{2} (33.8/sq mi)
- Time zone: UTC+01:00 (CET)
  - Summer (DST): UTC+02:00 (CEST)
- INSEE/Postal code: 34144 /34650
- ^{1} French Land Register data, which excludes lakes, ponds, glaciers > 1 km^{2} (0.386 sq mi or 247 acres) and river estuaries.

Lunas-les-Châteaux (French pronunciation: [lynas le ʃɑto]; Occitan: Lunaç) is a commune in the Hérault department in southern France. It was formed on 1 January 2025, with the merger of Lunas and Dio-et-Valquières.

== See also ==
- Communes of the Hérault department
