= Heng Seai Kie =

Malaysian politician

Yang Berbahagia Datuk Heng Seai Kie DMSM
- 王赛芝

Deputy Minister of Women, Family and Community Development
- In office 4 June 2010 – 15 May 2013
- Prime Minister: Najib Razak
- Preceded by: Chew Mei Fun
- Succeeded by: Azizah Mohd Dun
- Constituency: Senator

Deputy Minister of Information, Communications, Arts and Culture I
- In office 10 April 2009 – 4 June 2010 Serving with Joseph Salang Gandum (Deputy Minister of Information, Communications, Arts and Culture II)
- Prime Minister: Najib Razak
- Preceded by: Teng Boon Soon (Deputy Minister of National Unity, Arts, Culture and Heritage)
- Succeeded by: Maglin Dennis d'Cruz
- Constituency: Senator

Personal details
- Born: 12 June 1962 (age 64) Alor Setar, Kedah, Federation of Malaya
- Party: Malaysian Chinese Association (MCA)
- Other political affiliations: Barisan Nasional (BN)

Datuk Heng Seai Kie (born 12 June 1962) is a Malaysian politician who served as Deputy Minister of Women, Family and Community Development of Malaysia from June 2010 to May 2013 and Deputy Minister of Information, Communications, Arts and Culture from April 2009 to June 2010 in the Barisan Nasional (BN) administration under Prime Minister Najib Razak. She is a member of the Malaysian Chinese Association (MCA), a component party of the BN coalition.

== Politics ==
She was appointed as Deputy Minister of Information, Communications, Arts and Culture, alongside Joseph Salang Gandum on 10 April 2009. From 4 June 2010, Heng Seai Kie was reassigned as Deputy Minister of Women, Family and Community Development after a cabinet reshuffle.

== Controversy ==
In October 2012, MCA Women's Vice Chairman Heng Seai Kei accused PAS General Mursydul Tuan Guru Datuk Nik Abdul Aziz Nik Mat of encouraging rape of non-Muslim women who do not cover their private parts. Head of Information of the Pas Pusat Muslimat Council, Aiman Athirah al-Jundi regretted the frivolous allegation. PAS women are ready to organize a round table meeting to discuss the issue of women's private parts, the issue of rape and adultery from an Islamic perspective. It is possible that Heng did not understand the art of the Malay language (mantik) used by Nik Aziz. Heng's accusations were also supported by MCA President Datuk Seri Chua Soi Lek during the 2012 MCA General Assembly.

== Election results ==
Parliament of Malaysia
Year	Constituency	Candidate	Votes	Pct	Opponent(s)	Votes	Pct	Ballots cast	Majority	Turnout
2013	P017 Padang Serai	Heng Seai Kie (MCA)	25,714	40.71%	Surendran Nagarajan (PKR)	34,151	54.07%	64,584	8,437	87.16%
2013	P017 Padang Serai	Heng Seai Kie (MCA)	25,714	40.71%	Hamidi Abu Hassan (Berjasa)	2,630	4.16%	64,584	8,437	87.16%
2013	P017 Padang Serai	Heng Seai Kie (MCA)	25,714	40.71%	Gobalakrishnan Nagapan (IND)	390	0.62%	64,584	8,437	87.16%
2013	P017 Padang Serai	Heng Seai Kie (MCA)	25,714	40.71%	Othman Wawi (IND)	279	0.44%	64,584	8,437	87.16%
2018	P071 Gopeng	Heng Seai Kie (MCA)	19,145	24.16%	Lee Boon Chye (PKR)	48,923	61.75%	80,532	29,778	81.21%
2018	P071 Gopeng	Heng Seai Kie (MCA)	19,145	24.16%	Ismail Ariffin (PAS)	11,165	14.09%	80,532	29,778	81.21%

== Honours ==
- Malacca
  - Companion Class I of the Exalted Order of Malacca (DMSM) – Datuk (2011)
