= Luna Peak =

Luna Peak may refer to:

- Luna Peak (Washington), a mountain in the US
- Luna Peak (British Columbia), a mountain in Canada
