= Smoke-Filled Rooms =

2002 novel by Kristine Kathryn Rusch

- Author: Kristine Kathryn Rusch
- Language: English
- Genre: Historical fiction, Mystery fiction
- Publisher: Minotaur
- Publication date: 17 June 2002
- Publication place: United States
- ISBN: 0312976437
- OCLC: 913787734
- Preceded by: A Dangerous Road

Smoke-Filled Rooms is a historical mystery novel written by Kristine Kathryn Rusch under the pen name Kris Nelscott. The second entry in the Smokey Dalton, it follows Dalton, an African-American private investigator in the late 1960s who has escaped to Chicago from Memphis, Tennessee with Jimmy, a 10 year-old boy who had witnessed the assassination of Dalton's childhood friend Martin Luther King Jr.

== Reception ==
Dick Adler of the Chicago Tribune called the novel "mystery fiction at its highest, most-gripping level", opining that Rusch "has the heart, courage and brains for the job". Richard Lipez of The Washington Post it "something of a tease" and "hair-raising", writing that while the "denouement" involving Smokey Dalton's years in the Korean War is "clunky", the novel is "redeemed by its well-researched historical background." Publishers Weekly stated: "Fans of modern PI novels may enjoy this one, but it makes a very poor substitute for authentic black crime writing from that turbulent era, much of which is available in reprint."
