= Padang Serai =

Town in Kedah, Malaysia

Coordinates: 05°30′N 100°34′E

Padang Serai in Kulim District

Padang Serai (literal meaning: lemongrass field) is a little town in Kulim District, Kedah, Malaysia.

The sleepy hollow, surrounded by oil palm plantations and the nearby Kulim High-tech Industrial Zone has 56 percent Malay, 23 percent Indians and 12 percent Chinese voters.

There are few villages such as Kampong Guar Lobak, Kg Terat Batu, Kg Teluk Binu, Kg Sidam Kiri, Kg Sidam Kanan, Kg Sentosa, Permatang Durian and some estates like Ladang Bukit Selarong, Ladang Henrietta, Ladang Nagalilit. Labu Besar is 20km away.

Padang Serai is famous with its "Pekan Ahad" or Sunday's Market. Pasar Pagi Padang Serai Located 3132, Jalan Mahsuri 3J, Taman Mahsuri, 09400 Padang Serai, Kedah, Malaysia. Padang Serai is a fast expanding town with the mushrooming of many new housing estates.

For smallholders or planters, there is one Aik Hwa shop supplies fertilisers, herbicide and the fishing gear.

Padang Serai is also a parliamentary constituency. The seat was held formerly by N. Surendran of the People's Justice Party (PKR). He is replaced by Karuppaiya Muthusamy (PKR) in the 2018 Malaysian general election.
