= A Dangerous Road =

2000 novel by Kristine Kathryn Rusch

- Author: Kristine Kathryn Rusch
- Language: English
- Genre: Historical fiction, Mystery fiction
- Publisher: Minotaur
- Publication date: 7 July 2000
- Publication place: United States
- ISBN: 0312976437
- OCLC: 47166882
- Followed by: Smoke-Filled Rooms

A Dangerous Road is a historical mystery novel written by Kristine Kathryn Rusch under the pen-name Kris Nelscott. The first entry in the Smokey Dalton, the novel follows Dalton, an African-American private investigator in 1960s Memphis, Tennessee, who is visited by a Laura Hathaway, a White woman from the north, who hires him to find out why he is mentioned in the will of Hathaway's mother, who he does not recall ever having met. Dalton also deals with an upcoming visit from his now-estranged childhood friend Martin Luther King Jr.

== Reception ==
David Delman of The Philadelphia Inquirer opined: "Occasional preachiness hampers the narrative flow, but truly that's close to nitpicking. Nelscott has a story to tell, and she does it justice." Kirkus Reviews stated: "Despite an opening two pages that should have been cut, deceptively quiet first-timer Nelscott is a first-rate storyteller." Publishers Weekly wrote that Nelscott "conveys the feelings of her characters and the anxiety of the times with the vividness of an actual observer." Quinn Eli of the Philadelphia Weekly opined that Nelscott "falls short" in her "impressive attempt to weave two stories into one" and that "everything feels scattered and unresolved" by the end.
