= Dio-et-Valquières =

- Part of Lunas-les-Châteaux
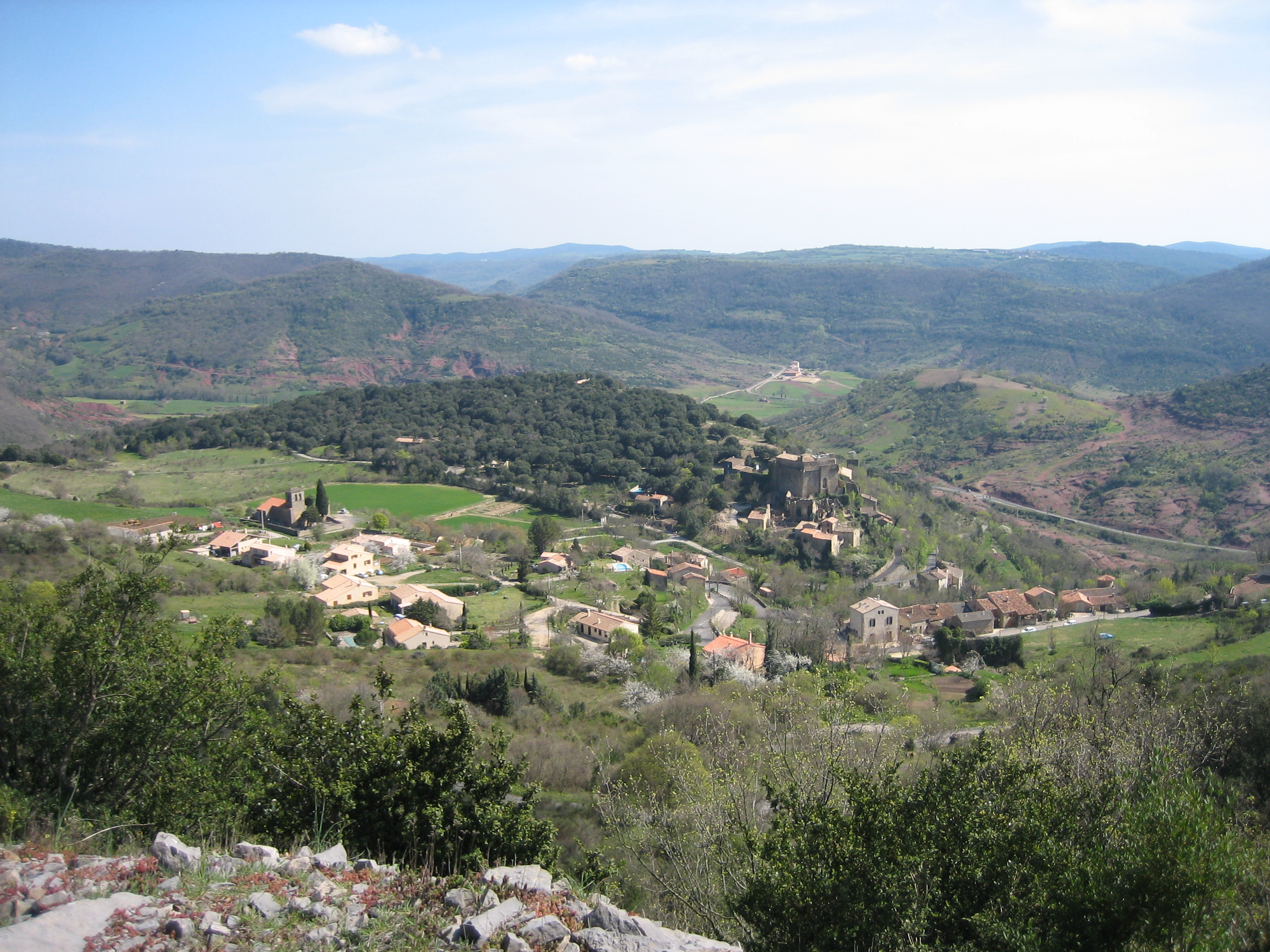
- Dio

- Coat of arms
- Location of Dio-et-Valquières
- Location within France Location within Occitanie
- Coordinates: 43°40′06″N 3°14′02″E
- Country: France
- Region: Occitania
- Department: Hérault
- Arrondissement: Béziers
- Canton: Clermont-l'Hérault
- Commune: Lunas-les-Châteaux
- Area^{1}: 18.77 km^{2} (7.25 sq mi)
- Elevation: 250 m (820 ft)
- Highest elevation: 701 m (2,300 ft)
- Lowest elevation: 256 m (840 ft)
- Population (2023): 159
  - Density: 8.47/km^{2} (21.9/sq mi)
- Time zone: UTC+01:00 (CET)
  - Summer (DST): UTC+02:00 (CEST)
- Postal code: 34650
- ^{1} French Land Register data, which excludes lakes, ponds, glaciers > 1 km^{2} (0.386 sq mi or 247 acres) and river estuaries.

Dio-et-Valquières (French pronunciation: [djo e valkjɛʁ]; Languedocien: Dian e Valquièiras) is a former commune in the Hérault department in southern France. On 1 January 2025, it was merged into the new commune of Lunas-les-Châteaux.

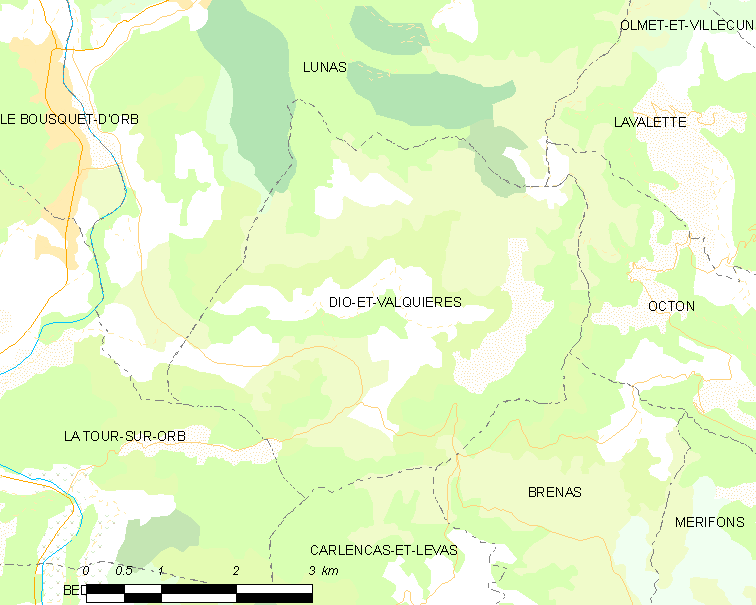
Map

== See also ==
- Communes of the Hérault department
