= Lunar =

Lunar most commonly means "of or relating to the Moon".

Lunar may also refer to:

== Arts and entertainment ==
- Lunar (series), a series of video games
- "Lunar" (song), by David Guetta
- "Lunar", a song by Priestess from the 2009 album Prior to the Fire
- Lunar Drive-in Theatre, in Dandenong, Victoria, Australia
- Lunars, a fictional race in the series The Lunar Chronicles by Marissa Meyer

== Other uses ==
- Lunar dynasty, a legendary house of warrior–rulers in ancient Indian texts
- Lunar Magic, Super Mario World level editor
- Lunar Design, or LUNAR, a San Francisco-based design consultancy
- Hasselblad Lunar, a digital camera
- Lunar, a brandname of Ethinylestradiol/cyproterone acetate, a birth control pill
- Lunar C (Jake Brook, born 1990), English rapper
- LUNAR (software) (1970–1972), question-answering system by Bill Woods (computer scientist)
- Lunar distance (navigation), used in celestial navigation

== See also ==
- Lunar calendar, based upon the monthly cycles of the Moon's phase
  - Lunar day, in such calendars
  - Lunar month, in such calendars
- Moon (disambiguation)
- Luna (disambiguation)
