= Kristine Kathryn Rusch =

American writer and editor

- Born: June 4, 1960 (age 66)
- Occupation: Writer
- Spouse: Dean Wesley Smith
- Writing career
- Genres: Science fiction, fantasy, mystery, romance, mainstream

Kristine Kathryn Rusch (born June 4, 1960) is an American writer and editor. She writes under various pseudonyms in multiple genres, including science fiction, fantasy, mystery, romance, and mainstream.

Rusch won the Hugo Award for Best Novelette in 2001 for her story "Millennium Babies" and the 2003 Endeavour Award for The Disappeared 2002. Her story "Recovering Apollo 8" won the Sidewise Award for Alternate History (short form) in 2008. Her novel The Enemy Within won the Sidewise (long form) in 2015. She is married to fellow writer Dean Wesley Smith; they have collaborated on several works.

She edited The Magazine of Fantasy & Science Fiction for six years, from mid-1991 through mid-1997, winning one Hugo Award as Best Professional Editor. Rusch and Smith operated Pulphouse Publishing for many years and edited the original (hardback) incarnation of Pulphouse Magazine; they won a World Fantasy Award in 1989.

Beginning in July 2010, Rusch had a regular column in the bi-monthly The Grantville Gazettes e-zine called Notes from The Buffer Zone until the magazine's demise in August 2022.

Rusch became a Writer Judge for the Writers of the Future contest in 2010.

== Bibliography ==
=== The Diving Universe ===
Novels:

- Diving into the Wreck, Pyr Books, 2009, ISBN 978-1591027867
- City of Ruins, Pyr Books, 2011, ISBN 978-1616143695
- Boneyards, Pyr Books, January 2012, ISBN 978-1616145439
- Skirmishes, WMG Publishing, September 2013, ISBN 978-0615795249
- The Falls, WMG Publishing 2016, ISBN 978-1561467686
- The Runabout, Asimov's cover story May/June 2017, WMG Publishing 2017, ISBN 978-1561467945
- The Renegat, WMG Publishing 2019, ISBN 978-1561460908
- Squishy's Teams, WMG Publishing 2020, ISBN 978-1561463596
- Thieves, WMG Publishing 2021, ISBN 978-1561463718

Novellas:

- Diving into the Wreck, Asimov's cover story, December 2005
- Room of Lost Souls, Asimov's cover story, April/May 2008
- The Spires of Denon, Asimov's cover story, April/May 2009; WMG Publishing 2019, ISBN 978-1561462995
- Becoming One with the Ghosts, Asimov's, October/November 2010
- Becalmed, Asimov's, April/May 2011, ISBN 978-0615811185
- Stealth, Asimov's, October/November 2011
- Strangers at the Room of Lost Souls, WMG Publishing, 2013
- Dix, Asimov's cover story March/April 2018
- Joyride, Asimov's, November/December 2018
- The Death Hole Bunker, Asimov's, July/August 2023

=== The Fey Universe ===
==== The Fey ====
- Vol. 1: The Sacrifice, 1995 (Illustrated by David O'Connor (illustrator), Dawn Wilson in 1996, and Albin Egger-Lienz in 2001)
- Vol. 2: The Changeling, 1996 (Illustrated by Anne Yvonne Gilbert)
- Vol. 3: The Rival, 1997 (Illustrated by Anne Yvonne Gilbert)
- Vol. 4: The Resistance, 1998 (Illustrated by Anne Yvonne Gilbert)
- Vol. 5: Victory, 1998 (Illustrated by Anne Yvonne Gilbert)

==== Black Throne ====
- Vol. 1: The Black Queen, 1999
- Vol. 2: The Black King, 2000

=== Retrieval Artist ===
- Vol. 1: The Disappeared, 2002
- Vol. 2: Extremes, 2003
- Vol. 3: Consequences, 2004
- Vol. 4: Buried Deep, 2005
- Vol. 5: Paloma, 2006
- Vol. 6: Recovery Man, 2007
- Vol. 7: Duplicate Effort, 2009
- Vol. 8: Anniversary Day: Anniversary Day Saga, Book 1, 2011
- Vol. 9: Blowback: Anniversary Day Saga, Book 2, 2012
- Vol. 10: A Murder of Clones: Anniversary Day Saga, Book 3, 2015
- Vol. 11: Search & Recovery: Anniversary Day Saga, Book 4, 2015
- Vol. 12: The Peyti Crisis: Anniversary Day Saga, Book 5, 2015
- Vol. 13: Vigilantes: Anniversary Day Saga, Book 6 , 2015
- Vol. 14: Starbase Human: Anniversary Day Saga, Book 7, 2015
- Vol. 15: Masterminds: Anniversary Day Saga, Book 8, 2015

=== Star Wars ===
- The New Rebellion, 1996

=== Stand-alone novels ===
- The Gallery of His Dreams, 1991
- The White Mists of Power, 1991
- Heart Readers, 1993
- Façade, 1993
- Traitors, 1993
- Alien Influences, 1994
- Sins of the Blood, 1994
- The Devil's Churn, 1996
- Fantasy Life, 2003
- The Tower, 2013
- The Enemy Within, 2014

=== Short fiction ===
Collections

- Stained Black, 1992
- Stories for an Enchanted Afternoon, 2001
- Little Miracles and Other Tales, 2001
- The Retrieval Artist and Other Stories, 2002
- Recovering Apollo 8 and Other Stories, 2010

=== Non-fiction ===
- "The Top Ten Things I Can't Do with My Kindle". The Internet Review of Science Fiction. VII (1). January 2010.

=== Pseudonymous work ===
==== Works as Kris Rusch ====
Kristine Kathryn Rusch has written one mainstream novel as "Kris Rusch".

- Hitler's Angel, 1998

==== Works as Kris Nelscott ====
Kristine Kathryn Rusch writes mystery novels using the pen-name "Kris Nelscott", featuring Smokey Dalton, an African-American unlicensed private investigator, in Memphis, Tennessee.

===== Smokey Dalton =====
- Vol. 1: A Dangerous Road, 2000
- Vol. 2: Smoke-Filled Rooms, 2001
- Vol. 3: Thin Walls, 2002
- Vol. 4: Stone Cribs, 2004
- Vol. 5: War at Home, 2005
- Vol. 6: Days of Rage, 2006
- Vol. 7: Street Justice, 2015

==== Works as Kristine Grayson ====
Kristine Kathryn Rusch writes romances, under the name "Kristine Grayson".

- Utterly Charming, 2000
- Thoroughly Kissed, 2001
- Completely Smitten, 2002
- Simply Irresistible, 2003
- Absolutely Captivated, 2004
- Totally Spellbound, 2005
- Wickedly Charming, 2011

==== Works as Sandy Schofield ====
Kristine Kathryn Rusch and Dean Wesley Smith use the common pseudonym "Sandy Schofield" for a part of their collaborative works.

- Star Trek: Deep Space Nine: The Big Game, 1993
- Aliens: Rogue, 1995
- Quantum Leap: The Loch Ness Leap, 1997
- Predator: Big Game, 1999

==== Works as Kathryn Wesley ====
Kristine Kathryn Rusch and Dean Wesley Smith use the common pseudonym "Kathryn Wesley" for a part of their collaborative works.

- The 10th Kingdom, 2000
- Aladdin, 2000
- The Monkey King, 2001
- Salem Witch Trials, 2003

=== Collaborations with Kevin J. Anderson ===
==== Afterimage ====
- Vol. 1: Afterimage, 1992
- Vol. 1-2: Afterimage/Aftershock, 1998

=== Collaborations with Jerry Oltion ===
==== Short fiction ====
- Kristine Kathryn Rusch; Jerry Oltion (October–November 1997). "Deus X". F&SF. 93 (4&5).

=== Collaborations with Dean Wesley Smith ===
==== The Tenth Planet ====
- Vol. 1: The Tenth Planet, 1999
- Vol. 2: The Tenth Planet: Oblivion, 2000
- Vol. 3: The Tenth Planet: Final Assault, 2000

==== Roswell ====
- No Good Deed, 2001
- Little Green Men, 2002

==== Star Trek ====
===== Classic =====
- The Rings of Tautee, 1996
- Treaty's Law, 1997
- New Earth 5: Thin Air, 2000

===== The Next Generation =====
- Klingon!, 1996
- The Soldiers of Fear, 1996
- Vectors: Double Helix #2, 1999

===== Voyager =====
- The Escape, 1995
- Echoes, additionally with Nina Kiriki Hoffman, 1998
- Section 31: Shadow, 2001

===== Deep Space Nine =====
- The Mist: The Captain's Table #3, 1998
- The Long Night, 1996

===== Enterprise =====
- By the Book, 2002

==== X-Men ====
- X-Men, 2000

==== Article ====
- "It Is Just Good Business," L. Ron Hubbard Presents Writers of the Future Volume VII, pp. 322–329. Bridge Publications: Los Angeles. 1991.

=== Critical studies and reviews of Rusch's work ===
A murder of clones

- Sakers, Don (June 2015). "The Reference Library". Analog Science Fiction and Fact. 135 (6): 105–108.

The Peyti crisis

- Sakers, Don (June 2015). "The Reference Library". Analog Science Fiction and Fact. 135 (6): 105–108.

———————

Bibliography notes
