= Lunacy =

Lunacy may refer to:

- Lunacy, the condition suffered by a lunatic, now used only informally
- Lunacy (film), a 2005 Jan Švankmajer film
- Lunacy (video game), a video game for the Sega Saturn video game console
- Luna Sea, a Japanese rock band originally named Lunacy
  - Lunacy (album), their 2000 album
- The following of the Roman goddess Luna, a variation of the Greek goddess Selene
- Lunacy (FIRST), the name of the FIRST Robotics Competition 2009 game
- Luna-C (born 1973), British DJ and record producer
- "Lunacy", a song by Swans from The Seer

== See also ==
- Luna (disambiguation)
- Lunatic (disambiguation)
