= Azman Nasrudin =

Malaysian politician

Yang Berhormat Dato' Azman Nasrudin DSSS PJK MP
- عزمان نصرالدين
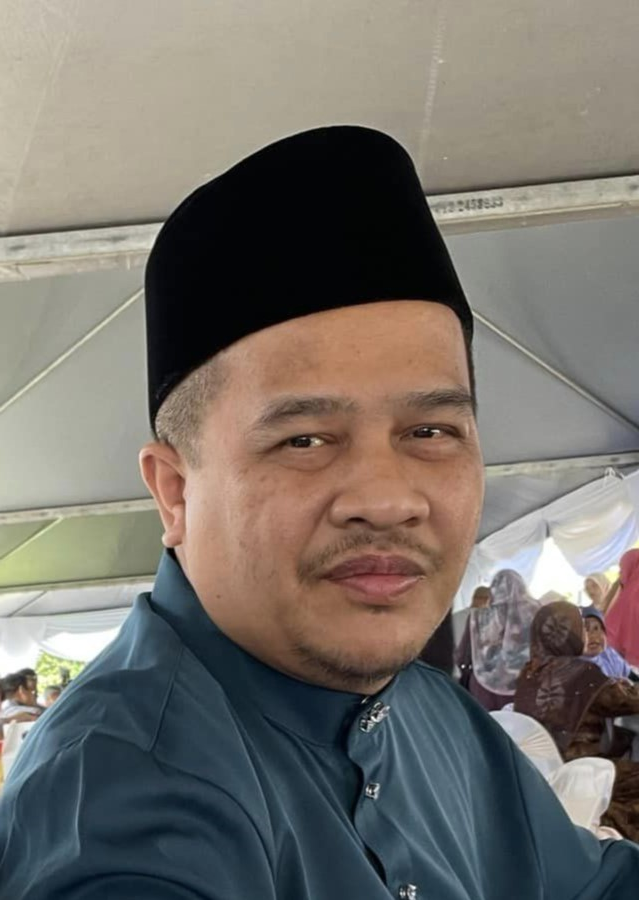
- Azman in 2024

Member of the Malaysian Parliament for Padang Serai
- Incumbent
- Assumed office 7 December 2022
- Preceded by: Karupaiya Mutusami (PH–PKR)
- Majority: 16,260 (2022)

Member of the Kedah State Executive Council
- In office 20 May 2020 – 14 August 2023
- Monarch: Sallehuddin
- Menteri Besar: Muhammad Sanusi Md Nor
- Portflio: Agriculture, Food Industries, Plantation, Commodities Industry, Transport and Indian Community Affairs
- Preceded by: Himself (Agriculture and Transport); Summugam Rengasamy (Indian Community Affairs); Portfolio established (Food Industries, Plantation and Commodities Industry); Portfolio abolished (Agro-based and Primary Industries)
- Succeeded by: Dzowahir Ab Ghani (Agriculture, Plantation and Transportation); Wong Chia Zhen (Indian Community Affairs); Portfolio abolished (Food Industries, Plantation and Commodities Industry)
- Constituency: Lunas
- In office 1 August 2018 – 17 May 2020
- Monarch: Sallehuddin
- Menteri Besar: Mukhriz Mahathir
- Portfolio: Agriculture, Agro-based, Transport and Primary Industries
- Preceded by: Himself (Agriculture, Agro-based, Transport); Portfolio established (Primary Industries); Portfolio abolished (Human Development)
- Succeeded by: Himself (Agriculture, Agro-based, Transport); Portfolio abolished (Agro-based and Primary Industries)
- Constituency: Lunas
- In office 22 May 2018 – 1 August 2018
- Monarch: Sallehuddin
- Menteri Besar: Mukhriz Mahathir
- Portfolio: Agriculture, Agro-based, Transport and Human Development
- Preceded by: Suraya Yaacob (Agriculture and Agro-Based); Portfolio abolished (Transport); Aminuddin Omar (Human Development)
- Constituency: Lunas

Member of the Kedah State Legislative Assembly for Lunas
- In office 5 May 2013 – 12 August 2023
- Preceded by: Mohammad Radzhi Salleh (PR–PKR)
- Succeeded by: Khairul Anuar Ramli (PN–BERSATU)
- Majority: 9,084 (2013); 13,813 (2018)

Faction represented in Dewan Rakyat
- 2022–: Perikatan Nasional

Faction represented in Kedah State Legislative Assembly
- 2013–2018: People's Justice Party
- 2018–2020: Pakatan Harapan
- 2020: Malaysian United Indigenous Party
- 2020–2023: Perikatan Nasional

Personal details
- Born: Azman bin Nasrudin; 11 April 1972 (age 54) Sungai Bakap, Penang, Malaysia
- Citizenship: Malaysian
- Party: People's Justice Party (PKR) (–2020); Independent (2020); Malaysian United Indigenous Party (BERSATU) (since 2020)
- Other political affiliations: Pakatan Harapan (PH) (until 2020); Perikatan Nasional (PN) (since 2020)
- Spouse: Siti Hajar Abdullah
- Children: 5
- Education: University of Science Malaysia (BA)
- Occupation: Politician
- Profession: Teacher

Azman bin Nasrudin (born 11 April 1972) is a Malaysian politician who has served as the Member of Parliament (MP) for Padang Serai since December 2022. He served as Member of the Kedah State Executive Council (EXCO) in the Perikatan Nasional (PN) state administration under Menteri Besar Muhammad Sanusi Md Nor from May 2020 to August 2023 and in the Pakatan Harapan (PH) state administration under former Menteri Besar Mukhriz Mahathir from 2018 to 2020 and Member of the Kedah State Legislative Assembly (MLA) for Lunas from May 2013 to August 2023. He is a member of the Malaysian United Indigenous Party (BERSATU), a component party of the PN coalition was a member of the People's Justice Party (PKR), a component party of the PH coalition.

== Early life and education ==
Azman bin Nasrudin was born on 11 April 1972 at Sungai Bakap, Penang, Malaysia. He received his early education at SMK Agama Al-Mashoor and SMK Tunku Abdul Rahman, Alor Setar (STAR Alor Setar). He continued his studies at Institut Pendidikan Guru Malaysia Kampus Tuanku Bainun for his Diploma. He received his Bachelor's Degree of Arts (BA) (History and Political Science) from University of Science Malaysia (USM).

== Teaching career ==
Azman was served as school teacher for 22 years.

== Political career ==
=== Candidate for the Kedah State Legislative Assembly (2013) ===
In the 2013 state election, Azman made his electoral debut after being nominated by PR to contest for the Lunas state seat. Azman is contesting against Ananthan Somasundaram of Barisan Nasional, Vasanthi Ramalingam of Independent politician and Prebakarran Narayanan Nair of Homeland Human's Wellbeing Party. He won the seat by gaining 21,670 votes with the majority of 9,084.

=== Candidate for the Kedah State Legislative Assembly (2018) ===
In the 2018 state election, Azman nominated by PH to contest for the Lunas state seat. Azman is contesting against Ahmad Taufiq Baharum of Malaysian Islamic Party and Thuraisingam Muthu of Barisan Nasional. He successfully defend the seat by gaining 23,904 votes with the majority of 13,813.

=== 2020 defection and collapse of the Kedah PH state administration ===
On 12 May 2020, Azman and Sidam MLA Robert Ling Kui Ee of PH defected from PKR and became independent MLAs in support of PN, leading to the resignation of Mukhriz Mahathir as Menteri Besar and collapse of the PH state administration led by Mukhriz as PH had lost the majority support in the assembly required to form the government after both of them withdrew support for PH who had only a slim majority in the assembly. Following that, PH returned to the opposition while PN and BN became the government with the appointment of Muhammad Sanusi Md Nor of PN as the new Menteri Besar on 17 May 2020. Sanusi then reappointed him as EXCO member.

== Election results ==
Kedah State Legislative Assembly
Year	Constituency	Candidate	Votes	Pct	Opponent(s)	Votes	Pct	Ballots cast	Majority	Turnout
2013	N34 Lunas	Azman Nasrudin (PKR)	21,670	62.39%	Ananthan Somasundaram (MIC)	12,586	36.24%	35,125	9,084	86.73%
2013	N34 Lunas	Azman Nasrudin (PKR)	21,670	62.39%	Vasanthi Ramalingam (IND)	406	1.17%	35,125	9,084	86.73%
2013	N34 Lunas	Azman Nasrudin (PKR)	21,670	62.39%	Prebakarran Narayanan Nair (KITA)	71	0.20%	35,125	9,084	86.73%
2018	N34 Lunas	Azman Nasrudin (PKR)	23,904	57.62%	Ahmad Taufiq Baharum (PAS)	10,091	24.33%	42,043	13,813	83.50%
2018	N34 Lunas	Azman Nasrudin (PKR)	23,904	57.62%	Thuraisingam Muthu (MIC)	7,489	18.05%	42,043	13,813	83.50%

Parliament of Malaysia
Year	Constituency	Candidate	Votes	Pct	Opponent(s)	Votes	Pct	Ballots cast	Majority	Turnout
2022	P017 Padang Serai	Azman Nasrudin (BERSATU)	51,637	56.49%	Mohamad Sofee Razak (PKR)	35,377	38.70%	91,416	16,260	68.95%
2022	P017 Padang Serai	Azman Nasrudin (BERSATU)	51,637	56.49%	Sivarraajh Chandran (MIC) (Note: Withdrew after the Nomination Day in favor of PH candidate.)	2,983	3.26%	91,416	16,260	68.95%
2022	P017 Padang Serai	Azman Nasrudin (BERSATU)	51,637	56.49%	Ananda Ak (IND)	846	0.93%	91,416	16,260	68.95%
2022	P017 Padang Serai	Azman Nasrudin (BERSATU)	51,637	56.49%	Hamzah Abd Rahman (PEJUANG)	424	0.46%	91,416	16,260	68.95%
2022	P017 Padang Serai	Azman Nasrudin (BERSATU)	51,637	56.49%	Mohd Bakhri Hashim (WARISAN) (Note: Withdrew after the Nomination Day.)	149	0.16%	91,416	16,260	68.95%

== Honours ==
=== Honours of Malaysia ===
- Malaysia
  - Recipient of the 17th Yang di-Pertuan Agong Installation Medal (2024)
- Kedah
  - Knight Companion of the Order of Loyalty to Sultan Sallehuddin of Kedah (DSSS) – Dato' (2022)
  - Companion of the Order of Loyalty to Sultan Sallehuddin of Kedah (SSS) (2019)
  - Recipient of the Meritorious Service Medal (PJK) (2011)
