= Extremes (novel) =

2003 novel by Kristine Kathryn Rusch

- First edition
- Author: Kristine Kathryn Rusch
- Cover artist: Greg Bridges
- Language: English
- Series: The Retrieval Artist
- Genre: Science fiction, detective fiction novel
- Publisher: Roc
- Publication date: July 2003
- Publication place: United States
- Media type: Print (hardback & paperback)
- Pages: 373 pp
- ISBN: 0-451-45934-2 (first edition, paperback)
- OCLC: 52466199
- LC Class: CPB Box no. 2127 vol. 14
- Preceded by: The Disappeared
- Followed by: Consequences

Extremes is the second book in the Retrieval Artist series by Kristine Kathryn Rusch. The novels are situated at an unstated time in the future where humans have colonized many distant worlds. In addition, treaties with alien races allow for the extradition of humans to other worlds to stand trial. Since most of these extraspecies crimes carry a sentence of death, an industry has sprung up to hide these people. Those who vanish are called the Disappeared. Not everyone who disappears does so to hide from aliens' justice, some are hiding from human justice, others just want to escape from their past. Two professions have sprung up to find those people: Trackers and Retrieval Artists. Trackers, similar to bounty hunters, seek the disappeared and return them to justice, or to those willing to pay for them to be found again. Retrieval Artists also seek the disappeared, but instead of dragging them back to justice, are more often hired by lawyers seeking to have inheritances delivered (minus the sum it cost to find them). Frequently, retrieval artist are followed by trackers in order to find the individual being sought.

== Plot summary ==
During a marathon race that takes place on the Moon in the future, a corpse is discovered lying in the path the runners take. Noelle DeRicci, a detective, is sent to investigate. The corpse is initially identified as Jane Zweig, a famous business person who operates an extraterrestrial "extreme sports" corporation.

Miles Flint, the Retrieval Artist who used to work for DeRicci, is almost simultaneously hired to also look for Frieda Tey, who they think has been living under the name Jane Zweig.

Frieda Tey had been hiding from the results of her biological experiments. The most infamous being a virus that killed more than 200 subjects in an experiment reminiscent of the work of Josef Mengele. By the time that the police determine that the murder scene was staged, the fast-acting virus that Tey had used on Io was starting to affect the runners in the marathon.

== Reception ==
Richard McKinney of the SFRA Review opined that the novel "successfully blends, smoothly and thoughtfully, in a not overly-long narrative, diverse genres, numerous and serious ethical themes, multiple story-lines, interesting characters about whom we care, exciting story-telling, and complexly-developed extrapolation about possible futures." Thomas Easton of Analog Science Fiction and Fact wrote that Rusch "delivers a very readable and thought-provoking novel that satisfies the reader in just about every possible way."
