= Radio Luna =

Radio station in Montenegro

Radio Luna is a radio station in Montenegro. Its headquarters are in Plav. It is part of RTV Luna.
