= Luna Peak (British Columbia) =

Mountain in British Columbia, Canada

- Location within British Columbia

Highest point
- Elevation: 2,470 m (8,100 ft)
- Prominence: 245 m (804 ft)
- Listing: Mountains of British Columbia
- Coordinates: 52°10′57″N 126°08′14″W

Geography
- Location: British Columbia, Canada
- District: Range 3 Coast Land District
- Parent range: Pacific Ranges of the Coast Mountains
- Topo map: NTS 93D1 Jacobsen Glacier

Luna Peak is one of the Borealis Peaks in the Coast Mountains of British Columbia, Canada. The Borealis Peaks are located south of the Bella Coola River valley, west of the upper Atnarko River and north of the Monarch Mountain-Ha-Iltzuk Icefield massif. The peak was named for Luna, goddess of the Moon in Roman mythology.
