= Luna City =

Luna City is the name of a fictional colony on the Moon in science fiction stories, comic books, and games by numerous authors.

== Poul Anderson ==
- "Brake" (Anderson), from The Psychotechnic League

== Isaac Asimov ==
- "Waterclap"

== Robert A. Heinlein ==
- Have Space Suit—Will Travel
- Job: A Comedy of Justice
- The Moon Is A Harsh Mistress
- Future History stories, including
  - "It's Great to Be Back!"
  - "Space Jockey"
  - "The Menace from Earth"

== John Varley ==
- The Eight Worlds stories

== Other ==
- Judge Dredd (comic book)
- Moon Patrol (arcade video game)
- Mutant Chronicles (role-playing game)
