= Loóna =

Mobile app

Loóna (program)
- Developer(s): Loóna Inc. (USA)
- Initial release: May 2019; 5 years ago
- Platform: iOS, Android
- Available in: English, Russian
- Website: loona.app

Loóna is a mobile app designed for relaxation and sleep. Created in 2019, the app is available globally on iOS, macOS, iPadOS and Android.

The developer of the app is Loona Inc. (U.S.). Loóna was awarded the title of "Best App" in the U.S. by Google Play’s Best of 2020 Awards and won the 2021 Apple Design Award in the Visuals and Graphics category.

== History ==
Loóna was developed by the team behind the AR face-swap app MSQRD that was acquired by Facebook in 2016.

In 2019, after spending one year working for Facebook, Andrew Yanchurevich and Dmitry Doryn launched a new project—Loóna. Subsequently, Sergey Gonchar and Eugene Nevgen also left Facebook to join the venture.

Loóna was imagined as an app to induce relaxation and aid in the preparation for sleep. Initially, the app was created as a 3D coloring activity incorporating soothing music. Later, the inspiration for adding interactive storytelling emerged when Andrew Yanchurevich, who was reading bedtime stories to his three-year-old son on a nightly basis, noticed that he was becoming drowsy himself. The team went on to create tales describing what was happening in detailed dioramas to fully immerse users in the coloring process—catalyzing the concept of ‘sleepscapes’. Sleepscapes are immersive episodes that bundle music, storytelling, and coloring.

Loóna’s soft launch on iOS happened in May 2019, and on Android in June 2020.

Loóna investors include Elefund, Hoxton Ventures, and Natalia Vodianova, a supermodel and philanthropist.

The app is currently available in the English and Russian languages.

== Functionality ==
Loóna is a mix of 3D coloring, meditative music, and calming stories.

Project investor Natalia Vodianova attributes the app’s success to the concept that it is at the intersection of two industries—health and entertainment. Unlike other sleep and meditation apps that suggest users close their eyes and simply listen to the narration, Loóna aims to engage and immerse the audience in the experience. The app combines activity-based relaxation techniques and invites users to color in scenes while listening to music and storytelling specially created for each episode. The content library includes both fantastic tales, such as ‘Light of Hope’ or ‘The Luminous Realm,’ as well as more reality-based stories that take place in familiar locations such as a park in Paris or a cafe in Brooklyn. Some episodes are interconnected as ‘Easter eggs’ pop up across them.

Developers shared that one of the challenges behind creating the artwork was anticipating and avoiding potential visual triggers that would activate the users’ minds before bedtime— scattered objects being one such example. They were used in 3D dioramas to enhance graphic details but were disliked by users, causing unpleasant associations to their everyday lives and preventing them from relaxing.

== Reception ==
Loóna was awarded the title of “Best App” in the U.S. by Google Play’s Best of 2020 Awards.

‘The Best App of 2020 [Loóna] provides images and sounds that help you relax and fall asleep,’ according to CNN Business. The Guardian and Forbes noted that Loóna is ‘at the heart of the sleep aid revolution’ in a fast-growing market.

The app also won an accolade at the Apple Design Awards 2021 in the Visuals and Graphics category. Loóna has been ranked among the best apps for relaxation and sleep by Quartz.

In 2020, Andrew Yanchurevich, Dmitry Doryn, Sergey Gonchar, and Eugene Nevgen won ‘The Businessmen Of The Year’ nomination by GQ with the Loóna project. In 2021, Andrew Yanchurevich and Dmitry Doryn were nominated into Forbes Russia ’30 under 30’ rating in the ‘Entrepreneurs’ category as the founders of Loóna.
