= Luna (sculpture) =

Sculpture in Eugene, Oregon, U.S.

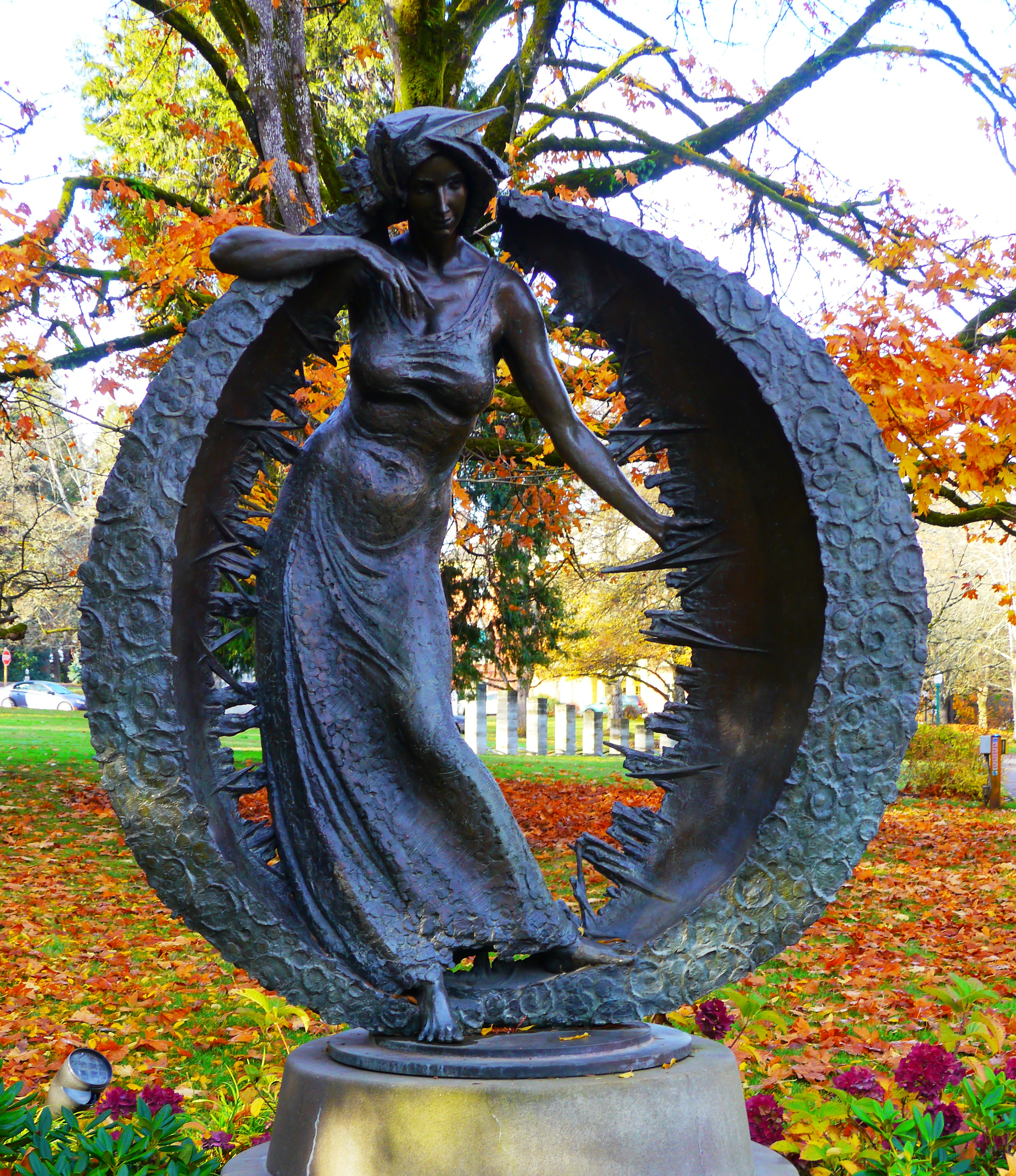
- The sculpture in 2017
- Artist: Ellen Tykeson
- Year: 2000
- Medium: Bronze sculpture
- Location: Eugene, Oregon, United States; 44.043816°N 123.073627°W

Luna is an outdoor bronze sculpture by American sculptor Ellen Tykeson, installed on the University of Oregon campus, in Eugene, Oregon, United States. It was created in 2000.

== See also ==
- 2000 in art
