= Lunas, Hérault =

Lunas
- Part of Lunas-les-Châteaux
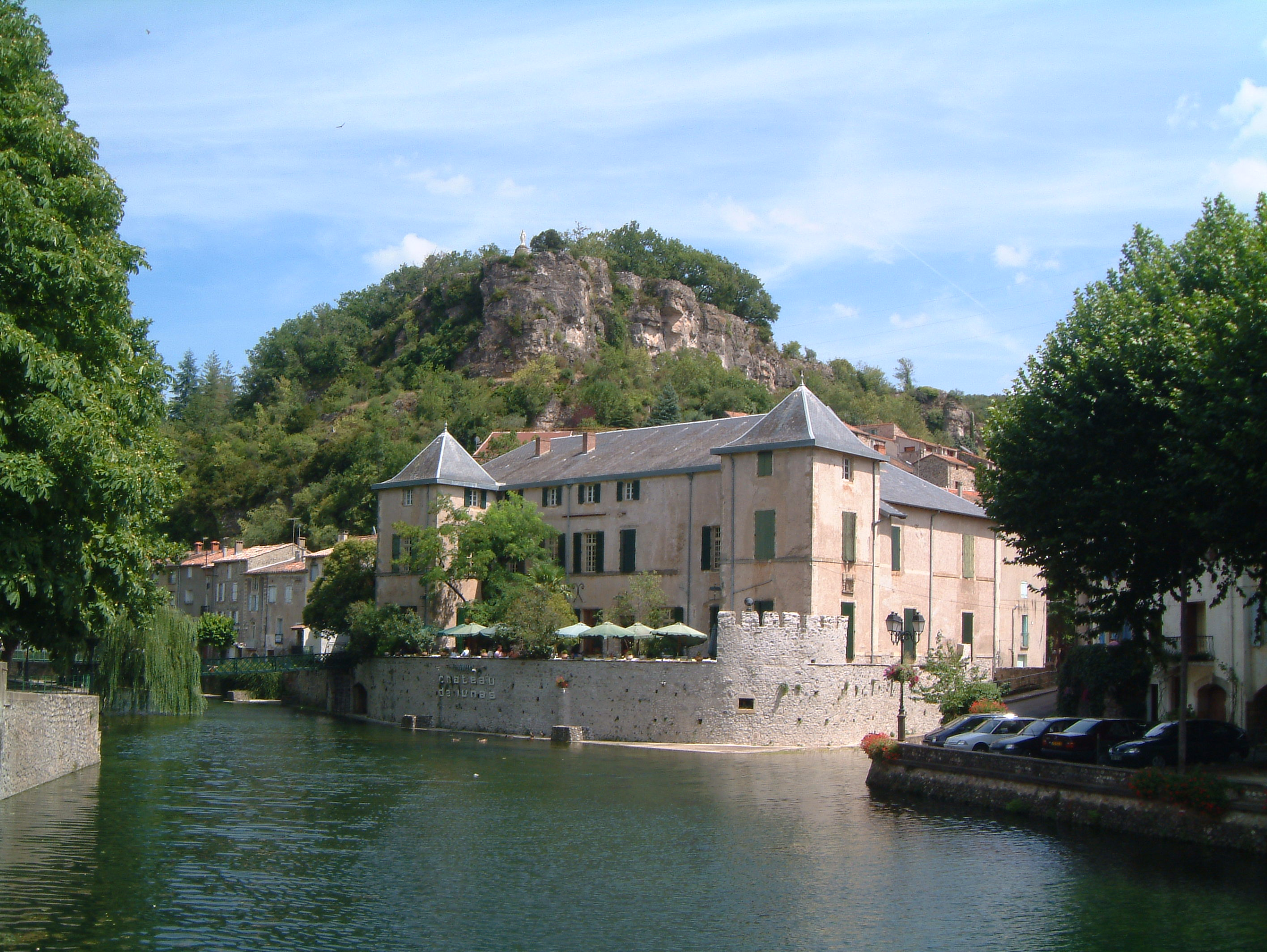
- Chateau of Lunas (restaurant)

- Coat of arms
- Location of Lunas
- Location within France Location within Occitanie
- Coordinates: 43°47′13″N 3°11′49″E
- Country: France
- Region: Occitania
- Department: Hérault
- Arrondissement: Béziers
- Canton: Clermont-l'Hérault
- Commune: Lunas-les-Châteaux
- Area^{1}: 44.89 km^{2} (17.33 sq mi)
- Elevation: 281 m (922 ft)
- Highest elevation: 768 m (2,520 ft)
- Lowest elevation: 234 m (768 ft)
- Population (2023): 673
  - Density: 15.0/km^{2} (38.8/sq mi)
- Time zone: UTC+01:00 (CET)
  - Summer (DST): UTC+02:00 (CEST)
- Postal code: 34650
- ^{1} French Land Register data, which excludes lakes, ponds, glaciers > 1 km^{2} (0.386 sq mi or 247 acres) and river estuaries.

Lunas (French pronunciation: [lynas]; Occitan: Lunaç) is a former commune in the Hérault department in southern France. On 1 January 2025, it was merged into the new commune of Lunas-les-Châteaux.

It is situated on the D35 between Lodève and Bédarieux.

== Geography ==
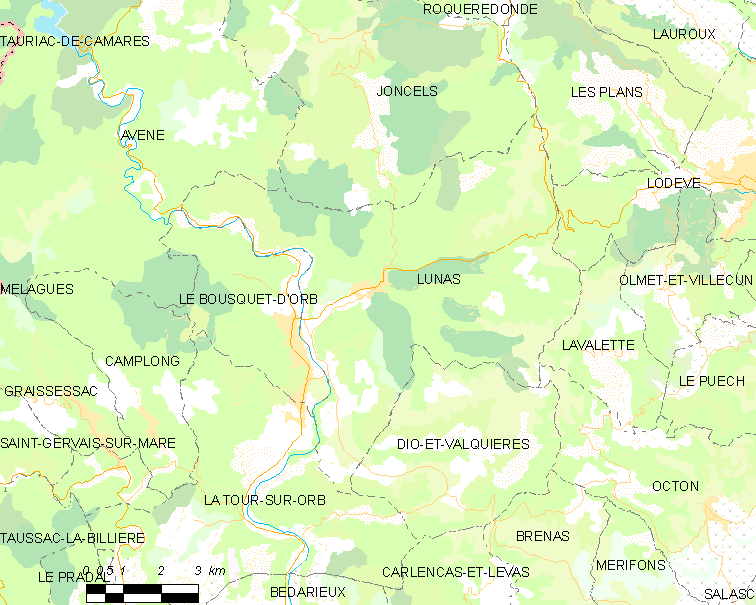
Map

=== Climate ===
Lunas has a warm-summer mediterranean climate (Köppen climate classification Csb). The average annual temperature in Lunas is 13.4 °C (56.1 °F). The average annual rainfall is 1,146.0 mm (45.12 in) with October as the wettest month. The temperatures are highest on average in July, at around 21.8 °C (71.2 °F), and lowest in January, at around 5.7 °C (42.3 °F). The highest temperature ever recorded in Lunas was 41.0 °C (105.8 °F) on 12 August 2003; the coldest temperature ever recorded was −10.4 °C (13.3 °F) on 2 March 2005.

Climate data for Lunas (1981–2010 averages, extremes 1998−present)
Month	Jan	Feb	Mar	Apr	May	Jun	Jul	Aug	Sep	Oct	Nov	Dec	Year
Record high °C (°F)	20.0 (68.0)	23.0 (73.4)	25.5 (77.9)	29.3 (84.7)	34.0 (93.2)	39.8 (103.6)	38.1 (100.6)	41.0 (105.8)	34.8 (94.6)	30.0 (86.0)	23.5 (74.3)	20.0 (68.0)	41.0 (105.8)
Mean daily maximum °C (°F)	9.6 (49.3)	10.8 (51.4)	14.8 (58.6)	17.7 (63.9)	22.1 (71.8)	27.3 (81.1)	29.4 (84.9)	29.1 (84.4)	24.4 (75.9)	19.1 (66.4)	13.1 (55.6)	9.9 (49.8)	19.0 (66.2)
Daily mean °C (°F)	5.7 (42.3)	6.2 (43.2)	9.3 (48.7)	12.0 (53.6)	15.9 (60.6)	20.1 (68.2)	21.8 (71.2)	21.7 (71.1)	17.8 (64.0)	14.3 (57.7)	9.0 (48.2)	6.0 (42.8)	13.4 (56.1)
Mean daily minimum °C (°F)	1.8 (35.2)	1.7 (35.1)	3.9 (39.0)	6.3 (43.3)	9.7 (49.5)	12.9 (55.2)	14.3 (57.7)	14.3 (57.7)	11.2 (52.2)	9.6 (49.3)	4.8 (40.6)	2.0 (35.6)	7.7 (45.9)
Record low °C (°F)	−8.9 (16.0)	−9.0 (15.8)	−10.4 (13.3)	−4.0 (24.8)	0.0 (32.0)	3.1 (37.6)	4.7 (40.5)	7.0 (44.6)	2.8 (37.0)	−2.2 (28.0)	−9.2 (15.4)	−9.3 (15.3)	−10.4 (13.3)
Average precipitation mm (inches)	114.5 (4.51)	97.5 (3.84)	68.7 (2.70)	105.0 (4.13)	85.2 (3.35)	51.7 (2.04)	33.0 (1.30)	51.8 (2.04)	99.0 (3.90)	161.3 (6.35)	144.0 (5.67)	134.3 (5.29)	1,146 (45.12)
Average precipitation days (≥ 1.0 mm)	9.3	7.8	7.5	8.5	7.4	5.2	3.6	5.0	5.9	9.0	8.1	8.2	85.4
Source: Meteociel

== See also ==
- Communes of the Hérault department
