= Luna (Ukrainian singer) =

Ukrainian singer-songwriter, model and photographer (born 1990)

Luna Луна
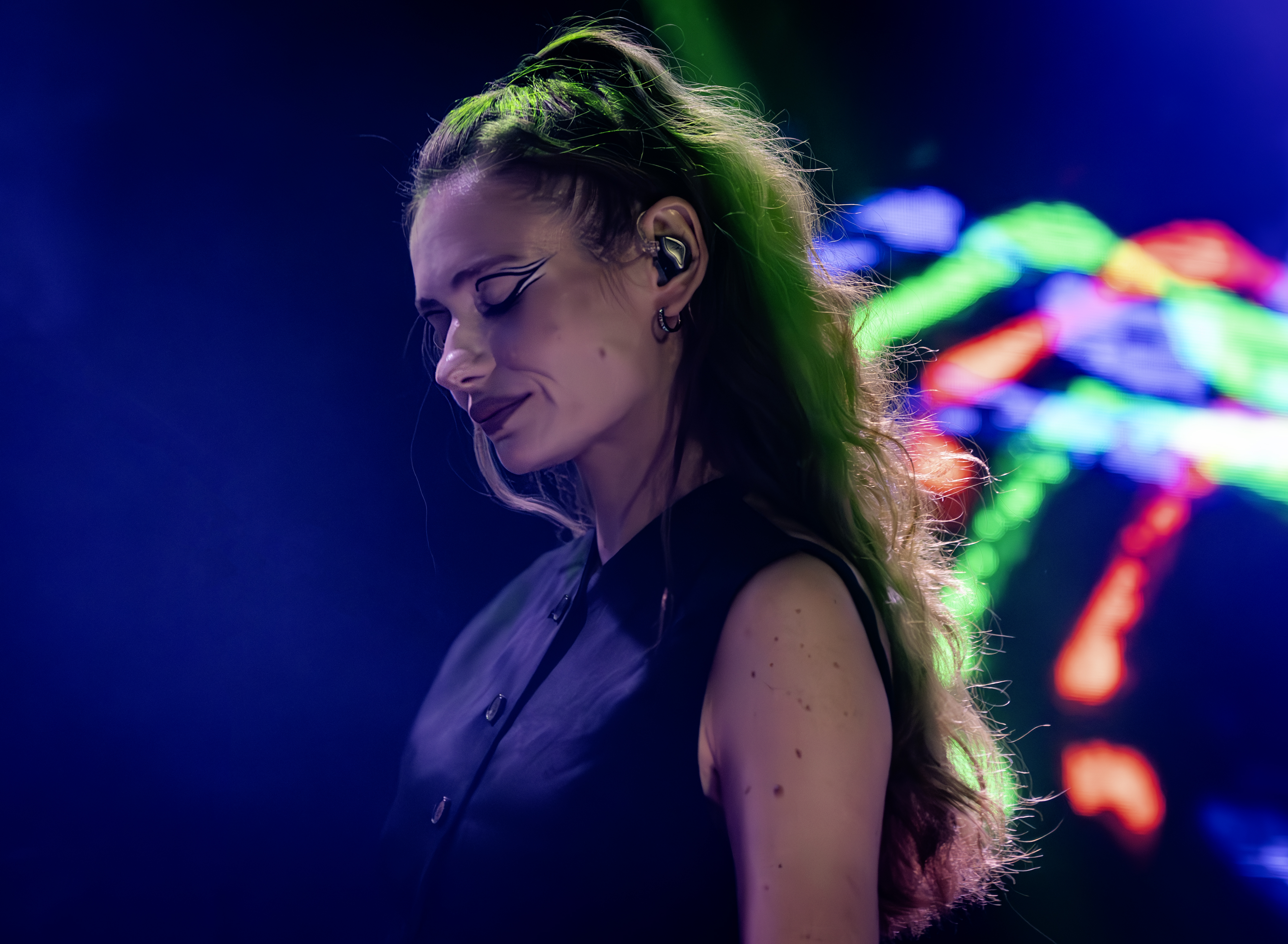
- Luna in 2024

Background information
- Born: Krystyna Viktorivna Herasymova; 28 August 1990 (age 36); Karl-Marx-Stadt, East Germany
- Origin: Kyiv, Ukraine
- Genres: synthpop; dream pop; electropop; indie pop
- Occupations: Singer; photographer; model
- Instrument: Vocals
- Years active: 2015–present
- Label: Luna Prod.
- Website: l-u-n-a.com

Krystyna Viktorivna Voloshchuk (née Herasymova; Ukrainian: Кристина Вікторівна Волощук, née Герасимова; born 28 August 1990), better known as Luna (Ukrainian: Луна), is a Ukrainian indie pop singer-songwriter, model and former photographer.

== Biography ==
She was born on 28 August 1990 in the city of Karl-Marx-Stadt, East Germany in the family of the Group of Soviet Forces in Germany serviceman. A few years later the family returned to Ukraine. Her music was praised by critics for the combination of electronic music with a melancholy mood, and also for references to '90s pop culture.

== Career ==
On 20 May 2016 a presentation of the debut album "Mag-ni-ty" took place in Kyiv, which debuted in the top 20 of iTunes Ukraine. On 23 May the album "Snowfall" by electronic artist Shumno was released, featuring Luna in the vocal recording for the song "Wake" Following this, there was an autumn tour called "Zatmenie" during which Luna performed in Moscow, Yekaterinburg, and Riga. On 28 October 2016 Luna released the mini-album "Sad Dance". On 7 November 2017 the album "Island of Freedom" was released, consisting of eight songs. "Island of Freedom" was part of a duology, with the second part titled "Enchanted Dreams" released on 24 October 2018. The album included 11 songs, with Krystyna Herasymova and Oleksander Voloshchuk as producers. The album debuted at number 1 on the iTunes Ukraine chart and at number 2 on the iTunes Russia chart. On 4 October 2019 Luna released her fourth album, "Trans" which includes 10 songs in the style of club electronic music. On 14 August 2020 the singer released her second mini-album, "Fata Morgana" featuring five dance tracks. In May 2023, Luna released the album "Illusion" – her first album entirely recorded in Ukrainian language.

== Personal life ==
From 2012 to 2018, she was married to Yuriy Bardash, the producer and vocalist of the Ukrainian rap group "Gryby". The couple has a son named Heorhii, who was born in 2012 when they were living in Los Angeles. In 2021, she married the guitarist from her band, Oleksandr Voloshchuk. She abstains from alcoholic beverages, is a vegetarian, and strives to maintain a healthy lifestyle. In one of her interviews, she mentioned that she occasionally smokes "weed". She dedicates two hours a day to meditation and is passionate about practicing yoga. On 17 May 2019, the international day against homophobia, transphobia, and biphobia, she participated in the project "Fight — You will Win!" to support the LGBTQ+ community in Ukraine.

== Discography ==
=== Albums ===
- Mag-ni-ty (2016)
- Ostrov svobody (2017)
- Zakoldovannyye sny (2018)
- Trans (2019)
- Illusion (2023)
- Mechty (2024)

=== Extended albums ===
- Grustnyy dens (2016)
- Fata Morgana (2020)

=== Singles ===
- 2015 – "Луна" (Moon)
- 2015 – "Осень" (Autumn)
- 2015 – "Алиса" (Alice)
- 2015 – "Лютики" (Buttercups)
- 2015 – "Мальчик, ты снег" (Boy, you're snow)
- 2016 – "Он с тобою не..." (With you he is not...)
- 2016 – "Бутылочка" (Little bottle)
- 2016 – "Самолёты" (Planes)
- 2016 – "Грустный дэнс" (Sad dance)
- 2016 – "Нож" (Knife)
- 2016 – "За край" (Over the edge)
- 2017 – "Пули" (Bullets)
- 2017 – "Огонёк" (Sparkle)
- 2017 – "Друг" (Friend)
- 2017 – "Free Love"
- 2018 – "Поцелуи" (Kisses)
- 2018 – "Jukebox"
- 2018 – "Спящая красавица" (Sleeping beauty)
- 2019 – "Тропик козерога" (Tropic of the Capricorn)
- 2019 – "Сижки" (Cigs)
- 2019 – "Кровавый колодец" (Bloody well)
- 2019 – "Сила стона" (Moan power)
- 2019 – "Дельфины" (Dolphins)
- 2019 – "Лунные гипнозы" (Lunar hypnosis)
- 2019 – "Сиреневый рай" (Lilac paradise)
- 2019 – "Золотые лепестки" (Golden petals)
- 2020 – "Fata Morgana"
- 2020 – "Летние бульвары" (Summer boulevards)
- 2020 – "Лебединая" (Swan song)
- 2021 – "Жанна Дарк" (Joan of Arc)
- 2021 – "Пташка" (Birdy)
- 2021 – "Ухажёр" (Admirer)
- 2022 – "Виграй" (Gain)
- 2022 – "Ще раз" (Once again)
- 2022 – "Пелікан" (Pelican)
- 2022 – "Сльози ллють дівчата" (The girls shed tears)
- 2023 — "Місячне сяйво" (Moonlight)
- 2023 — "Метелики" (Butterflies)
- 2024 — "Мій звір" (My Beast)
- 2024 — "Morpheus"

=== Charted singles ===
List of charted singles, with selected chart positions
Title	Year	Peak chart positions	Album or EP
Title	Year	RUS Stream.	Album or EP
"Del'finy"	2019	33	Trans
