= N. Surendran =

Malaysian lawyer and politician

- நா. சுரேந்திரன்

Member of the Malaysian Parliament for Padang Serai
- In office 5 May 2013 – 9 May 2018
- Preceded by: Gobalakrishnan Nagapan (PR–PKR)
- Succeeded by: Karupaiya Mutusami (PH–PKR)
- Majority: 8,437 (2013)

Personal details
- Born: N. Surendran s/o K. Nagarajan; 1966 (age 59–60) Kuantan, Pahang, Malaysia
- Citizenship: Malaysian
- Party: People's Justice Party (PKR) (–2024); Independent (since 2024)
- Other political affiliations: Pakatan Rakyat (PR) (–2015); Pakatan Harapan (PH) (2015–2024)
- Education: University of London
- Occupation: Politician
- Profession: Lawyer

N. Surendran s/o K. Nagarajan (Tamil: நா. சுரேந்திரன்), commonly referred to as N. Surendran, is a Malaysian lawyer and politician who served as the Member of Parliament (MP) for Padang Serai from May 2013 to May 2018. He is an independent. He was a member and Vice President of the People's Justice Party (PKR), a component party of the Pakatan Harapan (PH) and formerly Pakatan Rakyat (PR) coalitions.

== Early life, education and legal career ==
Surendran was born in Kuantan, Pahang and raised in Alor Setar, Kedah. His late father was a postmaster, and he has three siblings. He obtained a Bachelor of Laws from the University of London and was admitted to the Malaysian Bar in 1994.

Surendran practiced as a human rights lawyer, taking on cases of deaths in custody and representing the Hindu Rights Action Force (HINDRAF). He co-founded Lawyers for Liberty (LFL) in 2011 and became a key member of the group.

== Politics ==
In 2010, Surendran was appointed by Anwar Ibrahim as one of PKR's vice-presidents. The appointment was a surprise: Surendran was not a parliamentarian at the time and his selection was criticised by Gobalakrishnan Nagapan, the then Padang Serai MP who had just lost a ballot for the vice presidency. He remained in the post until 2014, when he was defeated for re-election in a party ballot.

In the 2013 general election, Surendran contested the Padang Serai parliamentary seat for the PKR. Gobalakrishnan had won the seat for PKR in the previous election but left the party to sit on the crossbench soon after his public attack on Surendran's appointment as a party vice-president. Surendran won the seat at the election, defeating four other candidates including Gobalakrishnan. Surendran had expressed surprise, travelling to Padang Serai from his home in Kuala Lumpur to campaign, at the extent of rural poverty there.

In November 2013, Surendran was suspended from the Parliament for six months. The government-dominated Parliament voted to suspend him on the ground of insulting the Speaker of the House of Representatives during a debate about the demolition of Hindu temples. In Jun 2014, Surendran notched up his fourth suspension from the Parliament amidst a debate on the Lynas Advanced Materials Plant. In August 2014, he was twice charged for sedition for criticising the overturning of opposition leader Anwar Ibrahim's acquittal on sodomy charges and alleging that the prime minister, Najib Razak, was "personally responsible" for Anwar's prosecution.

Surendran was dropped by PKR as candidate for the 2018 general election.

Surendran criticised the lack of response from PH lawmakers when a sedition probe was launched against former member of parliament Tony Pua over remarks he made in response to the Malaysian pardons board's decision to reduce former prime minister Najib Razak's 12-year jail sentence and RM210 million fine, calling it "shameful". He later announced his resignation from PKR, arguing that the party no longer represented "change and reform".

== Election results ==
Parliament of Malaysia
Year	Constituency	Candidate	Votes	Pct	Opponent(s)	Votes	Pct	Ballots cast	Majority	Turnout
2013	P017 Padang Serai	Surendran Nagarajan (PKR)	34,151	54.07%	Heng Seai Kie (MCA)	25,714	40.71%	64,584	8,437	87.16%
2013	P017 Padang Serai	Surendran Nagarajan (PKR)	34,151	54.07%	Hamidi Abu Hassan (BERJASA)	2,630	4.16%	64,584	8,437	87.16%
2013	P017 Padang Serai	Surendran Nagarajan (PKR)	34,151	54.07%	Gobalakrishnan Nagapan (IND)	390	0.62%	64,584	8,437	87.16%
2013	P017 Padang Serai	Surendran Nagarajan (PKR)	34,151	54.07%	Othman Wawi (IND)	279	0.44%	64,584	8,437	87.16%

== See also ==
- List of Malaysian politicians of Indian origin
