= Lunatic Lake =

Lake in the state of Alaska, United States

- Location within Alaska
- Location: Aleutians West Census Area, Alaska
- Coordinates: 51.94033°N 177.47087°E
- Type: lake

Lunatic Lake is a lake in Aleutians West Census Area, Alaska, in the United States.

Lunatic Lake was so named because the U.S. military needed a name to begin with the letter L in order to fit with their alphabetical naming system.

== See also ==
- List of lakes in Alaska
