= Lunatics (painting) =

2002 painting by Odd Nerdrum

- Artist: Odd Nerdrum
- Year: 2001–2002
- Medium: Oil on canvas
- Dimensions: 204 cm × 351 cm (80 in × 138 in)
- Location: Private collection

Lunatics is a 2002 oil on canvas painting by the Norwegian painter Odd Nerdrum. It depicts a barren landscape with a number of nude or semi-nude people wearing headgears such as crowns and helmets. In their 2014 catalogue note, Sotheby's described the painting as "a quintessential example of Nerdrum's large-scale allegories, presenting a sense of the apocalyptic".

A detail from the painting was used on the cover for Nerdrum's 2009 book How We Cheat Each Other.

== Description ==
A total of ten people sit scattered on the ground in a barren landscape. There are pebbles on the ground and rocky hills in the background. Some of the figures are nude, while others wear simple leather cloaks. The figures wear headgears associated with authority: crowns, helmets and fancy hats. One man in the foreground has a shield, while a figure in the far back is armed with a rod or spear.

The painting is signed "Nerdrum". It is dated "2001–2" on the left overlap and titled "Lunatics" on the right overlap.

== Provenance ==
The painting was exhibited at the Forum Gallery in New York City in 2004 as part of the exhibition Odd Nerdrum: New Paintings.

It was sold for 25,000 GBP in 2014 through Sotheby's in London, as part of the auction 1000 Ways of Seeing: The Private Collection of the late Stanley J. Seeger.

== Reception ==
Matthew Ballou of Image wrote in 2006: "Lunatics depicts a kind of group meditative state explored in earlier paintings like Twin Mother by the Sea (1999) and Dawn (1990), but takes it in a new direction. ... The painting has a tremendous sense of perspective and huge, deep space, in contrast to earlier works that often take place within tight tableaux."
