= Extremities =

Extremities may refer to:

== Anatomy ==
- Limb (anatomy) of a tetrapod animal, more specifically its distalmost portion, including:
  - Hand, a prehensile, multi-digited organ located at the end of the arm of bipedal primates (especially humans)
  - Foot, the terminal portion of a limb which bears weight and allows locomotion
  - Paw, a furry, padded foot with claws, common in many quadruped animals
- Appendage, any external body part that protrudes outwards from an organism's core, such as a limb, tail, ear, nose, horn/antler, external genitalia, antenna, tusk/mouthpart or raptorial or head

== Other ==
- Extremities (play), a 1982 play by William Mastrosimone
- Extremities (film), a 1986 film based on the play
- Extremities, a YouTube channel by YouTuber Sam Denby

== See also ==
- Extreme (disambiguation)
