= Khairul Anuar Ramli =

Malaysian politician

Yang Berhormat Tuan Khairul Anuar Ramli AMK MLA

Member of the Kedah State Legislative Assembly for Lunas
- Incumbent
- Assumed office 12 August 2023
- Preceded by: Azman Nasrudin (PH–PKR)
- Majority: 4,483 (2023)

Personal details
- Born: Khairul Anuar bin Ramli Malaysia
- Party: Malaysian United Indigenous Party (BERSATU)
- Other political affiliations: Perikatan Nasional (PN)
- Occupation: Politician

Khairul Anuar bin Ramli is a Malaysian politician who has served as Member of the Kedah State Legislative Assembly (MLA) for Lunas since August 2023. He is a member of the Malaysian United Indigenous Party (BERSATU), a component party of the Perikatan Nasional (PN) coalition.

== Election results ==
Kedah State Legislative Assembly
Year	Constituency	Candidate	Votes	Pct	Opponent(s)	Votes	Pct	Ballots cast	Majority	Turnout
2008	N35 Kulim	Khairul Anuar Ramli (IND)	1,101	5.25%	Lim Soo Nee (PKR)	10,559	50.34%	21,751	1,244	76.06%
2008	N35 Kulim	Khairul Anuar Ramli (IND)	1,101	5.25%	Lim Lee Choo (MCA)	9,315	44.41%	21,751	1,244	76.06%
2023	N34 Lunas	Khairul Anuar Ramli (BERSATU)	31,537	52.99%	Shamsul Anuar Abdullah (PKR)	27,054	45.45%	59,927	4,483	72.89%
2023	N34 Lunas	Khairul Anuar Ramli (BERSATU)	31,537	52.99%	Arichindarem Sinappayen (IND)	417	0.70%	59,927	4,483	72.89%
2023	N34 Lunas	Khairul Anuar Ramli (BERSATU)	31,537	52.99%	Rajendaran Nadajaran (IND)	364	0.61%	59,927	4,483	72.89%
2023	N34 Lunas	Khairul Anuar Ramli (BERSATU)	31,537	52.99%	Pannir Selvam Suppiah (IND)	148	0.25%	59,927	4,483	72.89%

== Honours ==
- Kedah
  - Member of the Order of the Crown of Kedah (AMK) (2025)
