= Merbau Pulas =

State constituency in Kedah, Malaysia

Merbau Pulas (N33)
Kedah constituency

State constituency
- Legislature: Kedah State Legislative Assembly
MLA
Siti Ashah Ghazali
PN
- Constituency created: 1974
- First contested: 1974
- Last contested: 2023

Demographics
- Electors (2023): 53,323

Merbau Pulas is a state constituency in Kedah, Malaysia, that has been represented in the Kedah State Legislative Assembly.

== Demographics ==
As of 2020, Merbau Pulas has a population of 102,931 people.

Ethnic breakdown of Merbau Pulas's electorate as of 2023
1. Malay (76.7%)
2. Indian (15.9%)
3. Chinese (6.74%)
4. Other ethnicities (0.71%)

== History ==
=== Polling districts ===
According to the gazette issued on 30 March 2018, the Merbau Pulas constituency has a total of 21 polling districts.

State constituency	Polling districts	Code	Location
Merbau Pulas (N33）	Guar Lobak	017/33/01	SK Guar Lobak
Merbau Pulas (N33）	Sidam Kanan	017/33/02	Maktab Mahmud Kulim
Merbau Pulas (N33）	Kuala Sedim	017/33/03	SMK Sungai Karangan
Merbau Pulas (N33）	Pekan Merbau Pulas	017/33/04	SJK (C) Aik Chee
Merbau Pulas (N33）	Kampung Jemerli	017/33/05	SK Merbau Pulas
Merbau Pulas (N33）	Bagan Sena	017/33/06	SK Labu Besar
Merbau Pulas (N33）	Sungai Karangan	017/33/07	SJK (C) Hua Min
Merbau Pulas (N33）	Padang Meiha	017/33/08	SK Bukit Selarong
Merbau Pulas (N33）	Ladang Padang Meiha	017/33/09	SK Sungai Karangan
Merbau Pulas (N33）	Batu Puteh	017/33/10	SK Pagar Museh
Merbau Pulas (N33）	Bukit Sedim	017/33/11	SK Ladang Bukit Sidim
Merbau Pulas (N33）	Kampung Bikan	017/33/12	SMK Labu Besar
Merbau Pulas (N33）	Kampung Jangkang	017/33/13	SMA Madrasah Ihsaniah
Merbau Pulas (N33）	Sungai Kob	017/33/14	SK Sungai Kob
Merbau Pulas (N33）	Kampung Sungai Ular	017/33/15	SK Sungai Ular
Merbau Pulas (N33）	Kulim High Tech	017/33/16	SJK (T) Ladang Bukit Mertajam; SK Taman Hi-Tech
Merbau Pulas (N33）	Padang China	017/33/17	Dewan Orang Ramai Kampong Padang China
Merbau Pulas (N33）	Taman Perak	017/33/18	Tabika Perpaduan Taman Perak
Merbau Pulas (N33）	Taman Senangin	017/33/19	SMK Sultan Bandlishah
Merbau Pulas (N33）	Kampung Baru	017/33/20	SK Tunku Abdul Malik
Merbau Pulas (N33）	Jalan Sedang	017/33/21	SJK (C) Kelang Lama

=== Representation history ===
Kedah State Legislative Assemblyman for Merbau Pulas
Assembly	No	Years	Member	Party
Constituency created from Lunas and Sidam
4th	N24	1974–1978	Mustapha Kassim	BN (UMNO)
5th	N24	1978–1982	Mustapha Kassim	BN (UMNO)
6th	N24	1982–1986	Mahmud Md Zain	BN (UMNO)
7th	N26	1986–1990	Mahmud Md Zain	BN (UMNO)
8th	N26	1990–1995	Mahmud Md Zain	BN (UMNO)
9th	N33	1995–1999	Che Pora Omar	BN (UMNO)
10th	N33	1999–2004	Marlia Abd. Latiff	BN (UMNO)
11th	N33	2004–2008	Mohd Hadzir Ismail	BN (UMNO)
12th	N33	2008–2013	Siti Ashah Ghazali	PR (PAS)
13th	N33	2013–2015	Siti Ashah Ghazali	PR (PAS)
13th	N33	2015–2016	Siti Ashah Ghazali	PAS
13th	N33	2016–2018	Siti Ashah Ghazali	GS (PAS)
14th	N33	2018–2020	Siti Ashah Ghazali	GS (PAS)
14th	N33	2020–2023	Siti Ashah Ghazali	PN (PAS)
15th	N33	2023–present	Siti Ashah Ghazali	PN (PAS)

== Election results ==
Kedah state election, 2023: Merbau Pulas
Party	Candidate	Votes	%	∆%
PN	Siti Ashah Ghazali	29,919	73.78	▲73.78
BN	Asmadi Abu Talib	10,634	26.22	▼6.82
Total valid votes		40,553	100.00	
Total rejected ballots		241		
Unreturned ballots		54		
Turnout		40,848	76.60	▼7.90
Registered electors		53,323		
Majority		19,285	47.56	▲46.13
PN hold		Swing		

Kedah state election, 2018: Merbau Pulas
Party	Candidate	Votes	%	∆%
PAS	Siti Ashah Ghazali	9,892	34.47	▼16.63
BN	Asmadi Abu Talib	9,454	33.04	▼15.86
PKR	Abd Razak Salleh	9,267	32.49	▲32.49
Total valid votes		28,613	100.00	
Total rejected ballots		429		
Unreturned ballots		0		
Turnout		29,137	84.50	▼2.90
Registered electors		34,498		
Majority		438	1.43	▼0.77
PAS hold		Swing		

Kedah state election, 2013: Merbau Pulas
Party	Candidate	Votes	%	∆%
PAS	Siti Ashah Ghazali	14,705	51.10	▼7.77
BN	Marlia Abd Latiff	14,072	48.90	▲7.77
Total valid votes		28,777	100.00	
Total rejected ballots		503		
Unreturned ballots		69		
Turnout		29,349	87.40	▲7.81
Registered electors		33,597		
Majority		633	2.20	▼14.94
PAS hold		Swing		

Kedah state election, 2008: Merbau Pulas
Party	Candidate	Votes	%	∆%
PAS	Siti Ashah Ghazali	12,224	58.57	▲26.89
BN	Abd. Wahab Din	8,648	41.43	▼26.89
Total valid votes		20,872	100.00	
Total rejected ballots		483		
Unreturned ballots		0		
Turnout		21,355	79.59	▼0.10
Registered electors		26,832		
Majority		3,576	17.14	▼19.50
PAS gain from BN		Swing		?

Kedah state election, 2004: Merbau Pulas
Party	Candidate	Votes	%	∆%
BN	Mohd Hadzir Ismail	13,825	68.32	▲5.24
PAS	Siti Aishah Ghazali	6,410	31.68	▼5.24
Total valid votes		20,235	100.00	
Total rejected ballots		452		
Unreturned ballots		0		
Turnout		20,687	79.69	▲6.29
Registered electors		25,958		
Majority		7,415	36.64	▲10.48
BN hold		Swing		

Kedah state election, 1999: Merbau Pulas
Party	Candidate	Votes	%	∆%
BN	Marlia Abd. Latiff	9,718	63.08	▼14.22
PAS	Abdul Talib Yaacob	5,687	36.92	▲14.22
Total valid votes		15,405	100.00	
Total rejected ballots		495		
Unreturned ballots		15		
Turnout		15,915	73.40	▲2.28
Registered electors		21,684		
Majority		4,031	26.16	▼28.44
BN hold		Swing		

Kedah state election, 1995: Merbau Pulas
Party	Candidate	Votes	%	∆%
BN	Che Pora Omar	10,906	77.30	▲3.32
PAS	Ahmad Jalani Ahmad	3,203	22.70	▲22.70
Total valid votes		14,109	100.00	
Total rejected ballots		498		
Unreturned ballots		8		
Turnout		14,615	71.12	▼2.00
Registered electors		20,549		
Majority		7,703	54.60	▲6.64
BN hold		Swing		

Kedah state election, 1990: Merbau Pulas
Party	Candidate	Votes	%	∆%
BN	Mahmud Md Zain	9,635	73.98	▲1.47
S46	Ab Salim Idris	3,389	26.02	▲26.02
Total valid votes		13,024	100.00	
Total rejected ballots		609		
Unreturned ballots		0		
Turnout		13,633	73.12	▲1.13
Registered electors		18,644		
Majority		6,246	47.96	▲3.94
BN hold		Swing		

Kedah state election, 1986: Merbau Pulas
Party	Candidate	Votes	%	∆%
BN	Mahmud Md Zain	8,577	72.51	▲0.99
PAS	Abdul Wahab Awang Junus	3,251	28.49	▼0.99
Total valid votes		11,828	100.00	
Total rejected ballots		709		
Unreturned ballots		0		
Turnout		12,537	71.99	▼4.06
Registered electors		17,415		
Majority		5,326	44.02	▲0.92
BN hold		Swing		

Kedah state election, 1982: Merbau Pulas
Party	Candidate	Votes	%	∆%
BN	Mahmud Md Zain	6,533	71.52	▲6.83
PAS	Abdul Mutalib @ Abd. Talib Ali	2,602	28.42	▼6.83
Total valid votes		9,135	100.00	
Total rejected ballots		219		
Unreturned ballots		0		
Turnout		9,354	76.05	▼0.66
Registered electors		12,299		
Majority		3,931	43.10	▲10.77
BN hold		Swing		

Kedah state election, 1978: Merbau Pulas
Party	Candidate	Votes	%	∆%
BN	Mustapha Kassim	5,084	64.69	▼1.16
PAS	Ustaz Khatib	2,543	32.36	▲32.36
Kesatuan Insaf Tanah Air	Annamaly Vadappah	232	2.95	▲2.95
Total valid votes		7,859	100.00	
Total rejected ballots		487		
Unreturned ballots		0		
Turnout		8,346	76.71	▲3.51
Registered electors		10,879		
Majority		2,541	32.33	▲1.63
BN hold		Swing		

Kedah state election, 1974: Merbau Pulas
Party	Candidate	Votes	%
BN	Mustapha Kassim	4,236	65.85
Independent	Haji Ishak Haji Taib	2,197	35.15
Total valid votes		6,433	100.00
Total rejected ballots		379	
Unreturned ballots		0	
Turnout		6,812	73.20
Registered electors		9,433	
Majority		2,039	30.70
This was a new constituency created.
