= Lunatic fringe =

Lunatic fringe, a derogatory term used to characterize members of a political or social movement as extremists with eccentric or fanatical views, may refer to:

- "Lunatic Fringe" (song), a 1981 song by Red Rider
- LFNG, a gene in the Notch pathway
- Jon Moxley (born 1985), nicknamed "Lunatic Fringe", American professional wrestler
- "Lunatic Fringe", a 1999 episode of the TV series The Net
- Lunatic Fringe, a screensaver in the After Dark screensaver pack
- "The Lunatic Fringe", branding for radio station WEBN, Cincinnati, Ohio, US
