= Lunas (state constituency) =

State constituency in Kedah, Malaysia

Lunas (N34)
Kedah constituency

State constituency
- Legislature: Kedah State Legislative Assembly
MLA
Khairul Anuar Ramli
PN
- Constituency created: 1959
- First contested: 1959
- Last contested: 2018

Demographics
- Electors (2023): 82,212

Lunas is a state constituency in Kedah, Malaysia, that has been represented in the Kedah State Legislative Assembly.

== Demographics ==
As of 2020, Lunas has a population of 159,006 people.

Ethnic breakdown of Lunas's electorate as of 2023
1. Malay (53.7%)
2. Chinese (24.3%)
3. Indian (21.3%)
4. Other ethnicities (0.73%)

== History ==
=== Polling districts ===
According to the gazette issued on 30 March 2018, the Lunas constituency has a total of 22 polling districts.

State constituency	Polling districts	Code	Location
Lunas (N34)	Pekan Padang Serai	017/34/01	SJK (C) Shang Cheng
Lunas (N34)	Jalan Baling	017/34/02	SMK Padang Serai
Lunas (N34)	Jalan Lunas	017/34/03	SMK Kulim
Lunas (N34)	Henrietta	017/34/04	SJK (T) Ladang Henrietta
Lunas (N34)	Victoria	017/34/05	SJK (T) Ladang Victoria
Lunas (N34)	Naga Lilit	017/34/06	SK Permatang Tok Dik
Lunas (N34)	Sungai Seluang	017/34/07	SK Sungai Seluang
Lunas (N34)	Batu Enam	017/34/08	SMK Lunas
Lunas (N34)	Kampung Baru Lunas	017/34/09	SK Lunas Jaya
Lunas (N34)	Pekan Lunas	017/34/10	SJK (C) Hwa Min
Lunas (N34)	Taman Sejahtera	017/34/11	SK Sri Limau
Lunas (N34)	Paya Besar	017/34/12	SK Jalan Paya Besar
Lunas (N34)	Taman Lobak	017/34/13	SMK Tunku Panglima Besar
Lunas (N34)	Sungai Limau	017/34/14	SK Sri Limau
Lunas (N34)	Kampung Keladi	017/34/15	SK Keladi
Lunas (N34)	Taman Selasih	017/34/16	SMK Taman Selasih
Lunas (N34)	Simpang Tiga Keladi	017/34/17	SMK Keladi
Lunas (N34)	Kampung Dusun	017/34/18	SMK Keladi
Lunas (N34)	Kelang Sago	017/34/19	SJK (C) Chio Min (A); SJK (C) Chio Min (B)
Lunas (N34)	Bandar Putra	017/34/20	SK Air Merah
Lunas (N34)	Taman Angsana	017/34/21	SK Taman Selasih
Lunas (N34)	Taman Semarak	017/34/22	SK Taman Selasih

=== Representation history ===
Kedah State Legislative Assemblyman for Lunas
Assembly	No	Years	Member	Party
Constituency created
1st	N22	1959–1964	Soon Cheng Leong (孙清龙)	Alliance (MCA)
2nd	N22	1964–1969	Soon Cheng Leong (孙清龙)	Alliance (MCA)
		1969–1971	State assembly was suspended	
3rd	N22	1971–1973	Soon Cheng Leong (孙清龙)	Alliance (MCA)
3rd	N22	1973–1974	Soon Cheng Leong (孙清龙)	BN (MCA)
4th	N23	1974–1976	Soon Cheng Leong (孙清龙)	BN (MCA)
4th	N23	1976-1978	Lim Wan Ming (林元明)	BN (MCA)
5th	N23	1978–1982	Fang Chok Seong (方卓雄)	BN (MCA)
6th	N23	1982–1986	Fang Chok Seong (方卓雄)	BN (MCA)
7th	N25	1986–1990	S. Subramaniam	BN (MIC)
8th	N25	1990–1995	S. Subramaniam	BN (MIC)
9th	N34	1995–1999	Joseph Fernandez	BN (MIC)
10th	N34	1999–2000	Joseph Fernandez	BN (MIC)
10th	N34	2000–2004	Saifuddin Nasution Ismail	BA (keADILan)
11th	N34	2004–2008	Ganesan Subamaniam	BN (MIC)
12th	N34	2008–2009	Mohammad Radzhi Salleh	PR (PKR)
12th	N34	2009–2013	Mohammad Radzhi Salleh	Independent
13th	N34	2013–2015	Azman Nasrudin	PR (PKR)
13th	N34	2015–2018	Azman Nasrudin	PH (PKR)
14th	N34	2018–2020	Azman Nasrudin	PH (PKR)
14th	N34	2020–2023	Azman Nasrudin	PN (BERSATU)
15th	N34	2023–present	Khairul Anuar Ramli	PN (BERSATU)

== Election results ==
Kedah state election, 2023
Party	Candidate	Votes	%	∆%
PN	Khairul Anuar Ramli	31,537	52.99	▲52.99
PH	Shamsul Anuar Abdullah	27,054	45.45	▲45.45
Independent	Arichindarem Sinappayen	417	0.70	▲0.70
Independent	Rajendaran Nadajaran	364	0.61	▲0.61
Independent	Pannir Selvam Suppiah	148	0.25	▲0.25
Total valid votes		59,520	100.00	
Total rejected ballots		310		
Unreturned ballots		97		
Turnout		59,927	72.89	▼10.61
Registered electors		82,212		
Majority		4,483	7.54	▼25.65
PN gain from PKR		Swing		?

Kedah state election, 2018
Party	Candidate	Votes	%	∆%
PKR	Azman Nasrudin	23,904	57.43	▼4.96
PAS	Ahmad Taufiq Baharom	10,091	24.24	▲24.24
BN	Thuraisingam Muthu	7,489	17.99	▼18.25
Total valid votes		41,625	100.00	
Total rejected ballots		418		
Unreturned ballots		0		
Turnout		42,043	83.50	▼3.50
Registered electors		50,336		
Majority		13,813	33.19	▲7.04
PKR hold		Swing		

Kedah state election, 2013
Party	Candidate	Votes	%	∆%
PKR	Azman Nasrudin	21,670	62.39	▼7.97
BN	Ananthan Somasundaram	12,586	36.24	▲6.60
Independent	Vasanthi Ramalingam	406	1.17	▲1.17
KITA	Prebakarran Nair	71	0.20	▲0.20
Total valid votes		34,733	100.00	
Total rejected ballots		392		
Unreturned ballots		110		
Turnout		35,235	87.00	▲7.71
Registered electors		50,336		
Majority		9,084	26.15	▼14.57
PKR hold		Swing		

Kedah state election, 2008
Party	Candidate	Votes	%	∆%
PKR	Mohammad Radzhi Salleh	17,836	70.36	▲29.91
BN	Ananthan Somasundaram	7,513	29.64	▼29.91
Total valid votes		25,349	100.00	
Total rejected ballots		360		
Unreturned ballots		2		
Turnout		25,711	79.29	▼1.57
Registered electors		32,386		
Majority		10,323	40.72	▲21.62
PKR gain from BN		Swing		?

Kedah state election, 2004
Party	Candidate	Votes	%	∆%
BN	Ganesan Subramaniam	13,218	59.55	▲10.96
PKR	Chua Tian Chang	8,979	40.45	▼10.96
Total valid votes		27,967	100.00	
Total rejected ballots		418		
Unreturned ballots		2		
Turnout		22,615	80.86	▲3.29
Registered electors		32,386		
Majority		4,239	19.10	▲16.52
BN gain from PKR		Swing		?

Kedah state by-election, 29 November 2000 Upon the death of incumbent, Joseph Fernandez
Party	Candidate	Votes	%	∆%
PKR	Saifuddin Nasution Ismail	10,511	51.17	▲51.17
BN	S. Anthonysamy	9,981	48.59	▼8.60
Independent	N. Letchumanan	50	0.24	▲0.24
Total valid votes		20,542	100.00	
Total rejected ballots		204		
Unreturned ballots		0		
Turnout		20,746	77.57	▲5.01
Registered electors		26,746		
Majority		530	2.58	▼24.96
PKR gain from BN		Swing		?

Kedah state election, 1999
Party	Candidate	Votes	%	∆%
BN	Joseph Fernandez	9,760	57.19	▼17.20
DAP	M. Kathiravelo	5,060	29.65	▲29.65
Independent	Hj. Ibrahim Hj. Mohd. Rashidi	2,158	12.65	▲12.65
Independent	N. Letchumanan (Katu Rajah)	87	0.51	▲0.51
Total valid votes		17,065	100.00	
Total rejected ballots		685		
Unreturned ballots		13		
Turnout		17,763	72.56	▼1.60
Registered electors		24,481		
Majority		4,700	27.54	▼21.24
BN hold		Swing		

Kedah state election, 1995
Party	Candidate	Votes	%	∆%
BN	Joseph Fernandez	11,034	74.39	▲23.05
S46	Majid @ ZinudinArop @ Arof	3,798	25.61	▼4.90
Total valid votes		14,832	100.00	
Total rejected ballots		420		
Unreturned ballots		1,060		
Turnout		16,312	74.16	▲0.07
Registered electors		24,481		
Majority		7,236	48.78	▲27.95
BN hold		Swing		

Kedah state election, 1990
Party	Candidate	Votes	%	∆%
BN	S. Subramaniam	9,258	51.34	▼14.02
S46	K. Murugaih	5,502	30.51	▲30.51
Independent	Hj. Mustapa Md. Taib	3,272	18.15	▲18.15
Total valid votes		18,032	100.00	
Total rejected ballots		830		
Unreturned ballots		0		
Turnout		18,862	74.09	▲0.98
Registered electors		25,458		
Majority		3,756	20.83	▼9.89
BN hold		Swing		

Kedah state election, 1986
Party	Candidate	Votes	%	∆%
BN	S. Subramaniam	10,020	65.36	▼9.42
PAS	Haji Ismail Mohamed	5,310	34.64	▲12.74
Total valid votes		15,330	100.00	
Total rejected ballots		544		
Unreturned ballots		0		
Turnout		15,874	73.11	▼4.65
Registered electors		21,713		
Majority		4,710	30.72	▼22.16
BN hold		Swing		

Kedah state election, 1982
Party	Candidate	Votes	%	∆%
BN	Fang Chok Seong	12,193	74.78	▲11.71
PAS	Khatib Shorbaini Haji Hassan	3,571	21.90	▼11.48
Independent	Ramley Ismail	541	3.32	▲3.32
Total valid votes		16,305	100.00	
Total rejected ballots		423		
Unreturned ballots		0		
Turnout		16,728	77.76	▼2.42
Registered electors		21,513		
Majority		8,622	52.88	▲23.19
BN hold		Swing		

Kedah state election, 1978
Party	Candidate	Votes	%	∆%
BN	Fang Chok Seong	8,910	63.07	▲63.07
PAS	Haji Arifin Haji Kechik	4,717	33.38	▲33.38
Kesatuan Insaf Tanah Air	Kana Kujambu	503	3.56	▲3.56
Total valid votes		14,130	100.00	
Total rejected ballots		757		
Unreturned ballots		0		
Turnout		14,887	80.18	
Registered electors		18,565		
Majority		4,193	29.69	
BN hold		Swing		

Kedah state by-election, 12 June 1976 Upon the death of the incumbent, Soon Cheng Leong
Party	Candidate	Votes	%	∆%
BN	Lim Wan Ming	5,635	47.67	
Independent	Ariffin Kechik	3,212	26.61	
DAP	Yeoh Boon Leong	2,221	18.41	
Parti Sosialis Rakyat Malaysia	Ahmad Mahamud	999	8.28	
Total valid votes		12,067	100.00	
Total rejected ballots		190		
Unreturned ballots		0		
Turnout		12,257	76.66	
Registered electors		15,991		
Majority		2,423	20.07	
MCA hold		Swing		

Kedah state election, 1974
Party	Candidate	Votes	%	∆%
On Nomination Day, Soon Cheng Leong won uncontested.
BN	Soon Cheng Leong			
Total valid votes			100.00	
Total rejected ballots				
Unreturned ballots				
Turnout				
Registered electors		14,803		
Majority				
BN hold		Swing		

Kedah state election, 1969
Party	Candidate	Votes	%	∆%
Alliance	Soon Cheng Leong	6,197	67.80	▼11.30
PMIP	Haji Ishak Haji Taib	2,943	32.20	▲11.30
Total valid votes		9,140	100.00	
Total rejected ballots		963		
Unreturned ballots		0		
Turnout		10,103	71.30	▼4.10
Registered electors		14,173		
Majority		3,254	35.60	▼22.60
Alliance hold		Swing		

Kedah state election, 1964
Party	Candidate	Votes	%	∆%
Alliance	Soon Cheng Leong	7,106	79.10	▲1.11
PMIP	Mohd Ramli Abdullah	1,877	20.90	▼1.11
Total valid votes		8,983	100.00	
Total rejected ballots		614		
Unreturned ballots		0		
Turnout		9,597	75.40	▼3.90
Registered electors		12,726		
Majority		5,229	58.20	▼2.22
Alliance hold		Swing		

Kedah state election, 1959
Party	Candidate	Votes	%
Alliance	Soon Cheng Leong	5,872	80.21
PMIP	Mohd Ramli Abdullah	1,449	19.79
Total valid votes		7,321	100.00
Total rejected ballots		306	
Unreturned ballots		0	
Turnout		7,627	79.30
Registered electors		9,623	
Majority		4,432	60.42
This was a new constituency created.
