= Star Trek spin-off fiction =

Fictional material related to Star Trek

The Star Trek franchise has produced a large number of novels, comic books, video games, and other materials, which are generally considered non-canon.

== Continuity ==
Star Trek spin-off fiction frequently fills in "gaps" within the televised show, often making use of backstage information or popular fan belief. Although officially licensed spin-off material will often maintain continuity within itself (particularly within books by the same authors), elements often contradict each other irreconcilably. For example, the end of Kirk's five-year mission has been depicted in several different incompatible ways.

Much fiction is set in a second five-year mission of Kirk's Enterprise, which the Okuda chronology dates after Star Trek: The Motion Picture (although novels often placed it before). Backstories and fates of characters are often elaborated on, an example being Leonard McCoy's divorced status, and his daughter, Joanna, originally intended to appear in what became the TOS episode "The Way to Eden".

Several original series characters are established as still being alive in the TNG era, including McCoy, Spock, and Scotty. In the books written by William Shatner, these are joined by a revived Captain Kirk. Several novels depict the careers of the younger members of the Enterprise crew after Star Trek VI: The Undiscovered Country. Captain Sulu and his daughter Demora Sulu appear in Peter David's novel The Captain's Daughter. In the novel The Sundered, Chekov serves as Sulu's first officer on USS Excelsior. The novel Federation has Chekov eventually becoming an admiral. Uhura is shown, in the novel Catalyst of Sorrows, to be Chief of Starfleet Intelligence in 2360. The 2006 novel Vulcan's Soul: Exiles has an Admiral Pavel Chekov, and Uhura is still serving as head of Starfleet Intelligence in 2377, at the age of 138. Peter David's novel Imzadi explores the backstory between Riker and Troi, and its sequel Triangle: Imzadi II covers the cooling of the Worf/Troi relationship, which was left unexplained on screen.

Spin-off fiction will often use re-use characters who appeared only once or twice in the actual show. Dr. Selar has appeared in more TNG novels than television episodes, and she and Elizabeth Shelby, who appeared in the two-part episode "The Best of Both Worlds" are major characters in the Star Trek: New Frontier series. The cast of the Starfleet Corps of Engineers series largely comes from such guest parts. Similarly, the IKS Gorkon series features Klingon characters drawn from a variety of TNG and DS9 episodes.

The spin-off fiction has also engaged in world building. Novels in the 1980s by Diane Duane and John M. Ford established a complex backstory and culture for the Romulans (Rihannsu) and Klingons respectively, which were later not taken up by TNG.

== Technical and reference manuals ==
A large range of fictional reference books have been produced over the years. More recent books of this sort have been by production staff and, whilst not binding on the series, nonetheless reflect the thinking of the production office, and are used as sourcebooks by writers.

- The Star Trek Star Fleet Technical Manual (Franz Joseph, 1975)
- Star Trek Spaceflight Chronology (Fred & Stan Goldstein, with Rick Sternbach, 1980)
- The Klingon Dictionary (Marc Okrand, 1985 (1st ed.), 1992 (2nd ed.))
- Mr. Scott's Guide to the Enterprise (Shane Johnson, 1987)
- Star Trek: The Next Generation Technical Manual (Michael Okuda and Rick Sternbach, 1991)
- Star Trek Chronology (Michael & Denise Okuda, 1993, 1996)
- Star Trek Encyclopedia (Michael & Denise Okuda, Debbie Mirek, 1994, 1996, 1999)
- Star Trek: Deep Space Nine Technical Manual (Rick Sternbach, Herman Zimmerman, Doug Drexler, 1998)
- Star Trek Star Charts (Geoffrey Mandel, 2002)

Similar material has also been published in the Star Trek Fact Files and the Star Trek Magazine.

== Prose fiction ==
Since 1967, hundreds of original novels, short stories, and television and movie adaptations have been published. The first original Star Trek novel to be published was Mission to Horatius by Mack Reynolds, which was published in hardcover by Whitman Books in 1968. Geared for younger readers, the novel became a collectible and in the 1990s, Pocket Books issued a facsimile edition.

The first publisher of Star Trek fiction aimed at adult readers was Bantam Books, which initially produced a bestselling series of novelizations of the original 79 episodes by James Blish that began in 1967. Later adaptations were done by Blish's wife, J. A. Lawrence, some of these were credited to Blish with others appearing under Lawrence's name. In 1970, Blish wrote the first original novel published by Bantam, Spock Must Die!, although subsequent novels did not appear until 1976.

From 1974, Ballantine Books published a 10-volume series of novelizations based upon episodes of Star Trek: The Animated Series, all written by Alan Dean Foster. Bantam also published a number of fotonovels based on episodes. In the late 1970s, Bantam published a number of original Star Trek novels, including two written by noted science fiction author Joe Haldeman, and one by original series scriptwriter David Gerrold.

Pocket Books began publishing Star Trek fiction in 1979, starting with a novelization of Star Trek: The Motion Picture by Gene Roddenberry himself, although the company's second Trek novel did not appear until 1981 due to Bantam being allowed to complete its publishing contract first. Eventually, Pocket Books would publish novels based upon every Trek series.

From around 1987 and with the debut of Star Trek: The Next Generation, Paramount took a closer role in supervising the books, disallowing story elements that were said to conflict with Gene Roddenberry's idea of Star Trek. In particular, recurring characters between books were discouraged, as was the use of concepts introduced in The Animated Series. This era saw disputes between authors and the Star Trek production office – specifically Roddenberry's "assistant", Richard Arnold – with many novels being rejected for not focusing directly on the main TOS cast. Some novels were, in lieu of rejection, heavily edited, resulting in being disowned publicly by their authors, such as with the novel Probe by Margaret Wander Bonanno.

A change of personnel at the Star Trek offices in the early 1990s – specifically the firing of Arnold immediately following the death of Gene Roddenberry in 1991 – led to a relaxation of policies regarding tie-in novels. Under editor John J. Ordover, many authors including Bonanno returned as Star Trek novelists in the 2000s after encouragement from fans, which continued under later editor Marco Palmieri, who has admitted being unaware of any prior blacklisting of authors resulting from the period of interference from Richard Arnold.

Prolific Star Trek novelists include Peter David, Diane Carey, Keith R.A. DeCandido, J.M. Dillard, Diane Duane, Michael Jan Friedman, and Judith and Garfield Reeves-Stevens. Several actors and writers from the television series have written books: William Shatner has written a series with the Reeves-Stevenses featuring a revived Captain Kirk in the 24th century, and John de Lancie, Andrew J. Robinson, J. G. Hertzler, and Armin Shimerman have written or co-written books featuring their respective characters. Voyager producer Jeri Taylor wrote two novels featuring backstory for Voyager characters, and screen authors David Gerrold, D. C. Fontana, and Melinda Snodgrass have also penned books. The Reeves-Stevenses were later hired as writers for Enterprise.

None of the Star Trek novels are considered "canon", meaning that producers of the television series feel free to contradict events and facts from the novels (although Pocket Books coordinates with the Star Trek offices to minimize the chances of this happening). Paula Block, director of CBS Consumer Products, is quoted in Voyages of the Imagination as saying, "Jeri Taylor's books were considered quasi-canon for a while because our licensees really wanted some sort of background structure".

=== New series ===
Starting from the mid-1990s, several ranges of books were created based upon original continuing characters and situations set in the Star Trek universe. The first of these, Star Trek: New Frontier by Peter David, focuses on the crew of the starship Excalibur. Some characters in this series were guest stars from episodes of Star Trek: The Next Generation, while others were from previous Star Trek titles by the same author, and still others were created originally for the series. New Frontier takes place in Sector 221-G, where the Excalibur is dispatched to help with the chaos created by the crumbling Thallonian Empire.

Michael Jan Friedman's Stargazer series features the adventures of Captain Picard on the Stargazer, and reuses characters he established in his 1992 TNG novel Reunion.

Another series, Star Trek: Challenger, created by Pocket editor John J. Ordover and writer Diane Carey, was planned as a continuation of the six-book storyline Star Trek: New Earth. Thus far only one book in the series has been published, Chainmail, part of the Gateways crossover series.

The Starfleet Corps of Engineers series is a series of eBooks by various authors, set in the same general time frame as the Next Generation series. This series features a group of highly trained engineers stationed aboard USS da Vinci and their adventures on various planets. The eBooks are eventually released in paperback collections. No new Corps of Engineers novels have been published since 2007.

From 2005 to 2012, a Star Trek: Vanguard series ran, set on Starbase 47, known as "Vanguard". It is set during The Original Series, and attempts to flesh out that particular period of fictional Star Trek history.

I.K.S. Gorkon was a brief series of novels by Keith R. A. DeCandido, the first Star Trek novel series to feature the Klingons instead of Starfleet. This series tells of the adventures of an all-new Qang (Chancellor)-class war cruiser, on a mission to conquer new planets for the Klingon Empire. The series grew from DeCandido's TNG Ambassador Worf-focused novel Diplomatic Implausibility.

=== Relaunch series ===
Pocket Books has also depicted events after the end of television series, allowing greater freedom in storytelling.

The Deep Space Nine relaunch takes place after the end of the series. New characters have been added to compensate for the loss of those who left at the end of the show. (Some books published after the end of the series, but before the official relaunch stories began, have been retroactively added to the relaunch, including the anthology The Lives of Dax and the novel A Stitch in Time.

The Star Trek: Voyager relaunch series, written by Christie Golden, is set after the end of the Voyager series. In the final episode of the series, "Endgame", the characters return home, and the books deal with their homecoming and further adventures.

After the release of the movie Star Trek Nemesis, which sees William Riker about to take command of a new ship, USS Titan, the Star Trek: Titan series was launched, depicting these adventures. As of 2014, several books have been set post-Nemesis, including several books dealing with the Borg.

The Enterprise series was also relaunched (see Star Trek: Enterprise relaunch), starting with the novel The Good That Men Do. The Enterprise novel Last Full Measure retcons the death of Trip, recounted in "These Are the Voyages...". Trip's death is shown in a holodeck program in the time frame of the TNG episode "The Pegasus", and The Good That Men Do establishes that the historical record has been altered.

Nine Star Trek novels, in the form of three thematic trilogies, have been written by William Shatner with Judith and Garfield Reeves-Stevens. These novels, starting with the second book, feature a Captain Kirk revived after Star Trek Generations. However, these novels are set in a different continuity to the rest of the Star Trek novels, receiving the nickname the Shatnerverse. A fourth Shatner/Reeves-Stevens trilogy, focusing on Kirk's time at Starfleet Academy and based on an idea pitched to Paramount for a TV series was launched in October 2007.

=== Crossover events ===
The Star Trek book ranges have since the mid-1990s featured various crossover events, with books published in multiple series. The first of these was the Invasion! series, published in 1996, featuring entries from The Original Series, The Next Generation, Deep Space Nine, and Voyager series.

1997's event was the Day of Honor, with novels in all four series. In a rare example of a novel concept being adopted into the TV series, the Voyager episode "Day of Honor" tied into this.

1998 saw six books published in the Star Trek: The Captain's Table crossover, including the four regular series, as well as one from Star Trek: New Frontier and another based on Captain Pike, the captain from the original Star Trek pilot episode, "The Cage". An anthology, entitled Tales from the Captain's Table, was published in 2005 following up the concept, with tales from new captains.

1999's Double Helix was a six-book series, nominally part of the numbered TNG book range, featuring characters from TNG, DS9, TOS, Voyager, New Frontier, and Stargazer.

The Star Trek: Gateways crossover was published in 2001, featuring entries from TOS, Challenger, TNG, DS9, Voyager, and New Frontier. These stories all end in a single finale anthology, What Lay Beyond. 2001's Star Trek: Section 31 was a thematic crossover, with each of the four books (TOS, TNG, DS9, and Voyager) featuring Section 31. Later in 2014, Section 31 became a standalone DS9 spinoff series of its own with the novel Disavowed.

In 2003, Star Trek: The Lost Era began exploring the underutilized part of the Star Trek timeline between Kirk's death in Star Trek Generations and the start of Star Trek: The Next Generation.

=== Anthologies ===
Anthologies Star Trek short fictionhave been published by Pocket Books. The Strange New Worlds competition, open to entries from the public, runs annually, and results in the publication of an anthology featuring the winning short stories.

Pocket Books also published themed short story anthologies.

- The Lives of Dax (1999, stories for each incarnation of Dax)
- Enterprise Logs (2000, a collection of stories about various captains of ships named Enterprise)
- No Limits (2002, a New Frontier anthology, featuring the first stories to focus on NF characters that were not written by Peter David)
- Prophecy and Change (2003, a 10th anniversary DS9 anthology)
- Tales of the Dominion War (2004, featuring various characters and the Dominion War)
- Tales from The Captain's Table (2005, featuring stories by new captains from the Captain's Table)
- Distant Shores (2005, a 10th anniversary Voyager anthology)
- Constellations (2006, a 40th anniversary TOS anthology)
- The Sky's the Limit, (2007, a 20th anniversary TNG anthology)

=== Status ===
A small but vocal minority of fans consider the novels to be fan fiction, although, being publications authorized by Paramount Pictures, they do not fit the general definition. A number of novels have been written or co-written by series actors, such as John de Lancie, J. G. Hertzler, Andrew J. Robinson, William Shatner, and Armin Shimerman.

A number of unlicensed and usually privately-published works do fit the normal definition of fan fiction, such as Jean Airey's The Doctor and the Enterprise, a novella-length work originally published as a stand-alone fanzine, and featuring a crossover with the Fourth Doctor from Doctor Who. This also appear as a small circulation semi-pro publication labeled as a "parody", presumably for legally reasons.

The Star Trek Expanded Universe website, a wiki designed to collect in-universe "facts" from fan-created content.

== Comics ==
Almost continuously since 1967, a number of companies have published comic book series based on Star Trek and its spin-off series.

=== Whitman 1967–1979 ===
==== Gold Key ====
The initial publisher of Star Trek comic adaptations and tie-in comics was Gold Key, part of Whitman Publishing. The series ran for 61 issues between July 1967 until March 1979, and is noted for the first nine issues of the series being published with photo covers, made up from promotional photographs supplied by Paramount, some of which were taken from various episodes of the original series.

Although Gold Key never gave creative credits in the pages of their comics, Len Wein, Arnold Drake, George Kashdan, Marty Pasko and Doug Drexler are known to have worked on numerous issues of the books, and have since come forth and identified which issues they specifically worked on. The first two issues of the Gold Key run was illustrated by Italian artist Nevio Zaccara, and the first half of the series was drawn by Alberto Giolitti, who being based in Rome did not see any of the Star Trek TV episodes until several years after he retired. The remainder of the series was illustrated by Alden McWilliams, with a few fill-ins by George Kashdan.

Gold Key and Whitman ceased publishing in 1979, with Star Trek No. 61 being one of the last comics produced by the company, and one issue in pre-production that never saw print.

==== Enterprise Log Series ====
Golden Press, another division of Western Publishing, reprinted several of the Gold Key Star Trek comics in four volumes. Entitled Enterprise Logs, these four books reprinted the first 35 issues between 1976 and 1977, and included some new material as part of a Psycho-Files feature in the first and third volumes.

==== Dan Curtis ====
In 1974, Dan Curtis produced a set of nine 6 in × 3 in (152 mm × 76 mm), 22-page color miniature comics. These were intended to be sold with bubble gum, like baseball cards, and each comic reprinted a story from one of the Gold Key comics. The set has been listed since 1977 as "Dan Curtis Reprints" in the "Giveaway Comics" section of Overstreet Comic Book Price Guide.

==== Dynabrite ====
Whitman also produced a series of 16 different comic reprints between 1978 and 1979 under the Dynabrite banner. These were 10" x 7-1/8" reprints of several of the Gold Key issues, with cardboard covers with blank inside covers.

==== Gold Key Reprints ====
In 2004, Checker Book Publishing Group was granted license from Paramount to reprint the Gold Key Star Trek comics in volumes under the name Star Trek: The Key Collection. Note that these new reprint editions do not contain the new material that was created especially for the previous Enterprise Log reprint editions, such as the Psycho-Files or Scotty's Diary. As of May 2007, seven editions have been printed, with the eighth edition expected in 2010 but as of this writing had not been scheduled.

=== UK newspaper strip ===
A weekly strip ran in the United Kingdom from 1969 to 1973 in the pages of TV21. Added as part of a revamp of the popular British magazine by City Publications, the strip ran for 118 issues, ending with the December 29, 1973 issue. Creators for this strip included numerous artists who worked on other TV21 and Valiant Magazine strips, such as Harry Lindfield, Mike Noble, Roland Turner, Carlos Pino, and Jim Baikie.

=== Marvel 1979–1982 ===
In 1979, with the launch of Star Trek: The Motion Picture, Marvel started publishing Star Trek comics, starting with an adaptation of that movie by Marv Wolfman and Dave Cockrum. Through a misunderstanding between Paramount and Marvel, the writers had been misinformed that they could not use any previously used characters from the TV series or the movie except for the main crew of the Enterprise. The series only lasted a total of 18 issues, ending in 1981 with Marvel choosing not to renew the license.

=== Newspaper strip 1979–1983 ===
A newspaper strip, initially written and illustrated by Thomas Warkentin also ran from 1979 to 1983, and was syndicated by the Los Angeles Times Mirror Syndicate. Warkentin stayed with the series until April 1981, penning a total of eight tales. During his tenure, Warkentin was aided by artists Mark Rice, Dan Spiegle, and Ron Harris. Among the highlights of Wartenkin's strips was his final story, a Harry Mudd adventure featuring his view of a rare glimpse at the news media of the Star Trek universe. During the series remaining fifteen months, creative teams changed twice, beginning with writer Marty Pasko and artist Padraic Shigetani, with Bob Myers replacing Shigetani. The strip concluded with Gerry Conway and Dick Kulpa sharing writing credit, with Ernie Colón handling the art.

=== DC Comics 1984–1996 ===
After the release of Star Trek II: The Wrath of Khan, DC Comics became the Star Trek comic licensee, publishing stories from 1984 set in the movie era (see Star Trek DC comics). In 1988, the series ended when Paramount withdrew its license at the advice of Richard Arnold following a series of disputes between Arnold and DC Comics, specifically with the comic's main author, Peter David. After a year's hiatus DC's second Star Trek series was launched with an adaptation of Star Trek V. Original stories took place in the large gap between Star Trek V and Star Trek VI, but did not continue from the previous series, so storylines from that series were either ignored or rewritten. Although more limited in scope than the first series due to restrictions from Paramount – which included a prohibition by Richard Arnold against the creation and use of original and non-series-related ongoing characters in the comic stories – and the controversial removal of Peter David as head writer, the series still lasted 80 issues. Howard Weinstein, who like David was also a Star Trek novelist, took over writing the comic with issue No. 20, and used the opportunity to flesh-out some of the changes between Star Trek V and VI, such as Sulu's promotion to captain of the Excelsior.

DC also published Star Trek: The Next Generation comics, starting with a mini-series in 1988. An ongoing monthly series was launched from October 1989, and was mainly written by Star Trek: The Next Generation novelist Michael Jan Friedman. The series would run until 1996, when DC chose not to renew the license due to declining sales and an increase in licensing fees from Paramount.

=== Malibu 1993–1995 ===
Beginning in 1993, Malibu Comics published an ongoing series based upon Star Trek: Deep Space Nine. Before DC Comics' relinquishing the license, Malibu and DC worked together to publish a DS9/TNG crossover comic. In addition, Malibu also published an annual and several one-shot special issues of the DS9 comic, and reportedly was preparing a Star Trek: Voyager comic that later saw print after the merger with Marvel Comics in 1996.

=== Marvel 1996–1998 ===
As part of the merger with Malibu Comics in 1996, Marvel obtained the Star Trek license, publishing comics under the "Marvel Paramount Comics" banner. Helping to launch the franchise were the comic adaptation of the film Star Trek: First Contact and the one-shot crossover Star Trek/X-Men. The quarterly Star Trek Unlimited series covered TOS and TNG. Marvel published monthly comics based upon Deep Space Nine and Voyager. They also introduced two new series, Star Trek: Early Voyages which dealt with Captain Pike's adventures as captain of the Enterprise (as depicted in the rejected TOS pilot "The Cage") and Star Trek: Starfleet Academy which dealt with a group of cadets, including Deep Space Nine's Ferengi, Nog. Finally, a five-issue limited series, Star Trek: Untold Voyages, followed Kirk on his second five-year mission following the events of Star Trek: The Motion Picture (similarly to the first Marvel series, but ignoring the original comics' stories). The ongoing series were canceled in 1998 due to sales being below expectations, with Early Voyages leaving an unresolved story by Dan Abnett and Andy Lanning.

=== Wildstorm 1999–2002 ===
Wildstorm were the next licensee. Wildstorm decided to not do an ongoing series, but instead a series of miniseries and trade paperback graphic novels from 1999 onwards. Writers included Nathan Archer, Kristine Kathryn Rusch and Dean Wesley Smith, Keith R.A. DeCandido. Scott Ciencin, Kevin J. Anderson, K. W. Jeter, John Ordover and David Mack. Due to poor sales and issues involving Wildstorm's merger with DC Comics, the license was allowed to expire in 2002 without renewal.

=== Tokyopop 2004– ===
In October 2004, Tokyopop announced plans to publish an anthology of Next Generation-based stories presented in the style of Japanese manga. Since then, the company has produced several anthologies of Star Trek manga stories starting in 2006 with Shinsei Shinsei. The first two books contained five manga stories and a prose short story from a recently released anthology by Pocket Books, with Pocket printing a manga story in the respective anthology to cross promote both companies products. The third book featured four, slightly longer, manga stories and an extra from a recent Pocket anthology of short novels.

Tokyopop originally planned their first book to be a collection of tales in the Star Trek: The Next Generation era but at the bequest of Paramount they chose to develop a Star Trek: The Original Series book instead, to be released for The Original Series' 40th Anniversary. After publishing their third TOS manga book the company announced plans for two TNG anthologies in late 2008 and early 2009. The first TNG book was delayed and saw publication in April 2009.

=== IDW Publishing ===
On November 9, 2006, IDW Publishing announced that they had secured the publishing rights to Star Trek from CBS Consumer Products.

IDW's first title was the six-issue miniseries, The Space Between, written by David Tischman and drawn by Casey Maloney. IDW followed up with the series Star Trek: Klingons: Blood Will Tell, along with other mini-series and one-shots, and is still regularly publishing new Star Trek-based material.

== Games ==
=== Star Fleet Universe ===
Developed over the last two decades and more as an expansive development of the background as supplied in the Original Series as well as in The Star Trek Star Fleet Technical Manual, the Star Fleet Universe introduces a range of new races and storylines (such as the Interstellar Concordium and the General War) as well as drawing from the Animated Series for inspiration – a modified version of the Kzinti are a major part of the SFU, for example – unlike the Paramount universe.

This universe lives and thrives in the range of works from Amarillo Design Bureau Inc. and (formerly) Task Force Games, as well as providing a fount for the unique merging of Star Trek continuities seen in the Star Fleet Command series of PC games.

SFU games include:

- Federation and Empire (1986)
- Federation Commander (2005)
- Prime Directive, 1993,
- GURPS Prime Directive, 2002,
  Based on Prime Directive, but with the GURPS ruleset.
- D20 Prime Directive, 2005
  Based on Prime Directive, but with the D20 ruleset.
- Star Fleet Battles (1979)
- Star Fleet Battle Force

The following computer games used elements from both the Paramount and ADB universes:

- Starfleet Command (1999)
- Starfleet Command II: Empires at War
- Starfleet Command: Orion Pirates

== Theme parks ==
- Star Trek: The Experience

Star Trek Adventure, Universal Studios Hollywood, 1988

The Universal Studios Hollywood theme park featured a Star Trek-themed attraction. The attraction regularly selected 10 volunteers from the audience and placed them into a Star Trek story line. The participants were dressed in Star Trek costumes and placed on sets, and coached to deliver scripted dialogue in several scenes. The scenes, which were recorded on video by Lilly, were quickly edited into a short film, the storyline of which was loosely based around material from the Star Trek films. The finished video was then shown to the audience, and the "actors" had the opportunity to purchase a copy of their video. This attraction closed after several years of operation. Several copies of these videos had been seen on YouTube.

Great American Adventure Amusement Park, Santa Clara near San Jose, Calif.

In the '80's Paramount Pictures Inc. bought the theme park operating company, Great American Theme Parks. After this corporate owner's change, the San Jose property added many major Star Trek elements to entertain the park's patrons. There were several costumed Star Trek characters entertaining patrons near the large Star Trek transplanted movie sets brought up from the studio. A Klingon starship command bridge and other interior set elements along with other Star Trek sets were delivered and installed in this property. There were costumed Star Trek characters 'meeting and greeting' the parks visitors.

== Fan productions ==
Several fan-made or unofficial films have been produced, using Star Trek characters or settings. Notable examples include:

- Starship Exeter, made in the style of the 1960s original series and set on a sister ship of the Enterprise.
- Star Trek: Phase II, formerly known as Star Trek: New Voyages, which depicts the fourth year of Kirk's five-year mission. George Takei and Walter Koenig have made guest appearances, and D. C. Fontana, original series script editor and writer, has written an episode.
- Star Trek: Of Gods and Men, directed by Tim Russ and featuring many Star Trek actors, produced as a "gift" to the fans.
