= Star Trek: Challenger =

Star Trek: Challenger is a spin-off series of Star Trek novels published by Pocket Books in the United States as part of Pocket's line. Based on the titular TV series created by Gene Roddenberry, the series was created by Pocket editor John J. Ordover and writer Diane Carey, and was a continuation of the six-book storyline, Star Trek: New Earth. The sixth and final New Earth book was subtitled Challenger, and served as a springboard for Star Trek: Challenger. It was published on August 1, 2000.

== Premise ==
The New Earth novel Challenger features the survivors of a destroyed starship's crew constructing and launching a new starship in a far-off colony area that is vital for the continuance of the Federation.

== Books ==
=== New Earth ===
- Star Trek: New Earth: Wagon Train to the Stars by Diane Carey ISBN 0-671-04296-3
- Star Trek: New Earth: Belle Terre by Dean Wesley Smith with Diane Carey ISBN 0-671-04297-1
- Star Trek: New Earth: Rough Trails by L.A. Graf ISBN 0-671-03600-9
- Star Trek: New Earth: The Flaming Arrow by Kathy Oltion and Jerry Oltion ISBN 0-671-78562-1
- Star Trek: New Earth: Thin Air by Kristine Kathryn Rusch and Dean Wesley Smith ISBN 0-671-78577-X
- Star Trek: New Earth: Challenger by Diane Carey ISBN 0-671-04298-X

=== Challenger ===
- Gateways #2: Chainmail by Diane Carey ISBN 0-7434-1855-7
- Gateways #7: What Lay Beyond (anthology) by Diane Carey, Peter David, Keith R.A. DeCandido, Christie Golden, Robert Greenberger, and Susan Wright ISBN 0-7434-5683-1

== Main characters ==
New Earth

- Rear Admiral James T. Kirk
- Commander Spock
- Doctor Leonard McCoy
- Commander Montgomery Scott
- Lieutenant Commander Hikaru Sulu
- Lieutenant Pavel Chekov
- Lieutenant Commander Uhura

Challenger

- Commander Nick Keller

== Authors ==
- Diane Carey
- L.A. Graf
- Dean Wesley Smith
- Kathy Oltion
- Jerry Oltion
- Kristine Kathryn Rusch
