= Oltion =

Oltion is a surname and given name.

== Surname ==
Notable people with this surname include:

- Jerry Oltion (born 1957), American writer
- Kathy Oltion, American writer

== Given name ==
Oltion is an Albanian male given name. Notable people with this name include:

- Oltion Bilalli (born 2002), Kosovan footballer
- Oltion Luli (born 1969), Albanian athlete
- Oltion Osmani (born 1972), Albanian football player
- Oltion Rapa (born 1989), Albanian football player
