= John J. Ordover =

American businessman and writer

- Occupations: stand-up comic, editor, publisher, entrepreneur
- Notable work: Lie There and Lose Weight: How I Lost 100 Pounds by Doing Next to Nothing (2018)

John J. Ordover is an American stand-up comic, founder and chief executive officer of JJO Marketing, and a digital art gallery owner. He is best known for being an editor at Pocket Books from 1992 to 2003, overseeing the Star Trek franchise licensed novels, and from 2003 to 2005 being editor-in-chief of Phobos Books. In 2018 he released the book Lie There and Lose Weight: How I Lost 100 Pounds by Doing Next to Nothing from Wilder Publications.

== Literary work ==
=== Star Trek: New Frontier ===
Ordover is the co-creator of such spin-off series as Star Trek: New Frontier (with writer Peter David), Star Trek: Starfleet Corps of Engineers and Star Trek: I.K.S. Gorkon (both with Keith R.A. DeCandido), Star Trek: Stargazer (with Michael Jan Friedman), and Star Trek: Challenger (with Diane Carey).

According to Peter David, the basic concept for New Frontier was Ordover's, as was the notion of using several already existing characters, with David having fleshed out the concept and created the original characters.

=== Star Trek: Deep Space Nine ===
Ordover and David Mack wrote the Star Trek: Deep Space Nine episodes "Starship Down". Both have story credits on "It's Only a Paper Moon", which was written as a teleplay by Ronald D. Moore.

=== Baconthology ===
Ordover edited BACONTHOLOGY: The Sweet and Savory Science Fiction Anthology featuring "baconized" stories by bestselling award-winning authors donating work supporting Ordover's charity work.

== Charity work ==
Ordover produces bacon themed charity events benefiting autistic children at his gallery.

=== Bacon-Palooza ===
Bacon-Palooza was held October 15–17, 2010.

=== Bacon-Palooza II ===
Bacon-Palooza II was held March 1–3, 2013. BACONTHOLOGY: The Sweet and Savory Science Fiction Anthology was the official event program book.

== Personal life ==
Ordover is also an active nudist, the founder of Clothing Optional Dinners, a dining club in New York City for nudists. On July 11, 2007, Ordover launched a nude dinner cruise from Sheepshead Bay, New York.

Ordover created a web site in September 2007 as a hoax to bring attention to the discrepancy between age of consent laws and marriage law.

== Novellas ==
- Identity Crisis (2005). Part of the Starfleet Corps of Engineers series.
