= Michael Jan Friedman =

Writer

- Born: March 7, 1955 (age 71); New York City, U.S.
- Occupation: Writer

Michael Jan Friedman (born March 7, 1955) is a New York City born American author of nearly 60 books of fiction and nonfiction, more than half of which are in licensed tie-in products of the Star Trek franchise. Ten of his titles have appeared on The New York Times Best Seller list. Friedman has also written for network and cable television, radio, more than 150 comic books, most of them for DC Comics.

== Novels ==
=== Star Trek ===
- Star Trek: The Original Series
  - #45. Double, Double (1989)
  - #56. Legacy (1991)
  - #58. Faces of Fire (1992)
  - #59. The Disinherited (1992) (with Peter David and Robert Greenberger)
  - #85. Republic: My Brother's Keeper 1 (1998)
  - #86. Constitution: My Brother's Keeper 2 (1998)
  - #87. Enterprise: My Brother's Keeper 3 (1998)
- Star Trek: The Next Generation
  - #9. A Call to Darkness (1989)
  - #12. Doomsday World (1990) (with Carmen Carter, Peter David and Robert Greenberger)
  - #15. Fortune's Light (1990)
  - #32. Requiem (1994) (with Kevin Ryan)
  - #56. The First Virtue: Double Helix 6 (1999) (with Christie Golden)
  - Reunion (1991)
  - Relics (1992)
  - All Good Things... (1994)
  - Crossover (1995)
  - Kahless (1996)
  - X-Men: Planet X (1998)
  - Q's Guide to the Continuum (1998) (with Robert Greenberger)
  - The Valiant (2000)
  - Double Helix Omnibus (2002) (with John Gregory Betancourt, Diane Carey, Peter David, Christie Golden, Kristine Kathryn Rusch, Dean Wesley Smith and John Vornholt)
  - Pantheon (2003)
  - The Hand of Kahless (2004) (with John M. Ford)
  - Death in Winter (2005)
- Star Trek: Miscellaneous
  - The Modala Imperative (1992)
  - Shadows on the Sun (1993)
  - Starfleet Year One (2001)
- Star Trek: Starfleet Academy
  - #6. Mystery of the Missing Crew (1994)
  - #7. Secret of the Lizard People (1995)
- Star Trek: Deep Space Nine
  - #18. Saratoga (1996)
- Star Trek: Day of Honor
  - #3. Her Klingon Soul (1997)
  - Star Trek Day of Honor (1997) (with Diane Carey, L.A. Graf, Kristine Kathryn Rusch and Dean Wesley Smith)
- Star Trek: Captain's Table
  - #2. Dujonian's Hoard (1998)
- Star Trek: Stargazer
1. Gauntlet (2002)
2. Progenitor (2002)
3. Stargazer: Three (2003)
4. Oblivion (2003)
5. Enigma (2003)
6. Maker (2004)

=== Star Wars ===
The New Jedi Order Series Knightfall I: Jedi Storm (this book was completed as the first in a 3-part series, which was cancelled).

=== Other novels ===
- After Earth
  - A Perfect Beast (2013) (with Robert Greenberger and Peter David)
  - Savior (2013) (short story)
- Aliens
  - Original Sin (2005)
- Batman and Robin Novelization (1997)
- Exile (1996)
- Fantastic Four
  - Redemption of the Silver Surfer (1998)
- The Glove of Maiden's Hair (1987)
- Lois & Clark: The New Adventures of Superman
  - Heat Wave (1996)
  - Exile (1996)
  - Deadly Games (1996)
- Lara Croft: Tomb Raider
  - Tomb Raider Tech Manual (2001)
- Magic Mirror (1988)
- Predator
  - Flesh And Blood (2007) (with Robert Greenberger)
- The Ultimates
  - Tomorrow Men (2006)
- Vidar
1. The Hammer and the Horn (1985)
2. The Seekers and the Sword (1985)
3. The Fortress and the Fire (1988)
- Wishbone
  - #5. Hunchdog of Notre Dame (1997)
  - The Mutt in the Iron Muzzle (1997)
- Wishbone Mysteries
  - #5. The Stolen Trophy (1998)
  - #16. The Sirian Conspiracy (2000)
- The Wolfman
  - Hunter's Moon (2007)
- X-Men
  - Shadows of the Past (2000)
  - The Chaos Engine Book 1: X-Men / Doctor Doom (2000)
- Short Stories
  - Firetrap (1996)

== Non-fiction ==
- Star Trek Federation Guide (1997) (Star Trek: The Original Series)

== Comics ==
=== DC Comics ===
- Darkstars #1-38, 0 (1992–1995)
- Batman Chronicles #23 – "Automotive" story only (1995)
- DC Universe: Holiday Bash #1 – "The Vessel" story only (1997)
- DC Universe: Trinity #1 – 'Darkstars' story only, 2 – plot only (1993)
- Flash #102, 103, 104, 105, 1,000,000 (1995)
- Flash Annual #10 – "Sound and Fury" story only (1997)
- Flash 80-Page Giant #1 – "Thunder and Lightning" story only (1998)
- Green Lantern Corps Quarterly #3 – 'Depth Charges' story only (1992)
- Justice League Quarterly #7 – 'Klaarsh Reunion' story only, #11- 15 – 'Praxis' features only (1992, 1993, 1994)
- Justice League Task Force #10-12 (1994)
- Legends of the DC Universe #15, 16, 17 (1999)
- Legends of the DC Universe 80-Page Giant #2 – "Twisted" story only (2000)
- New Titans #123, 124 (1995)
- Outlaws #1-8 (1991–1992)
- Star Trek: The Modala Imperative #1-4 (1991)
- Star Trek Annual #4 – 5 (1993, 1994)
- Star Trek The Next Generation Vol. 2 #1-17, 19–28, 30–50, 52–80, Annual 2–3, 6 (1989–1996)
- Star Trek The Next Generation: Shadowheart #1-4 (1994–1995)
- Star Trek The Next Generation Special #2 – 'The Choice' and 'Out of Time' stories only (1994)
- Superman 80-Page Giant #2 – "Under Control" story only (1999)

=== Image Comics ===
- Wildstorm! #4 - "Salvage Operation" story only (1995)

=== Marvel Comics ===
- 2099 Unlimited #5, 6 - "Now Playing" and "Galahad 2099" stories only (1994)
- Silver Surfer #101, 102 (1995)
- Silver Surfer: Loftier than Mortals #1–2 (1999)

== Television ==
- "Resistance" Star Trek: Voyager, Season 2, Episode 12, story by Michael Jan Friedman and Kevin J. Ryan
