= Wagon train (disambiguation) =

A wagon train is a group of wagons traveling together.

Wagon Train may also refer to:

- Wagon Train, a 1957–1965 American Western television series
- Wagon Train, a 1940 American film directed by Edward Killy and starring Tim Holt
- Wagon Train, the working title of the 1960 film Heller in Pink Tights
- The Wagon Train (Lucky Luke), the English-language title of the Lucky Luke graphic novel adventure La Caravane
- Wagon Train of 1843, a mass migration of emigrants heading for Oregon in 1843

== See also ==
- Wagon Train to the Stars, a 2000 Star Trek novel by Diane Carey
