= Death in Winter =

Novel by Michael Jan Friedman

- Author: Michael Jan Friedman
- Cover artist: James Wang
- Language: English
- Genre: Science fiction novel
- Publisher: Pocket Books
- Publication date: September 20, 2005
- Publication place: United States
- Media type: Print (Hardback)
- Pages: 336 pp
- ISBN: 0-7434-9721-X
- Followed by: Resistance

Death in Winter is a Star Trek: The Next Generation novel, written by Michael Jan Friedman, published in hardcover in September 2005.

== Plot ==
It is the first novel featuring Capt. Jean-Luc Picard to be set after Star Trek Nemesis. The plot concerns an attempt to stop a plague on a Romulan colony called Kevratas, and the relationship between Picard and Dr. Beverly Crusher. It also describes Dr. Crusher's first encounter of a similar plague as a teenager on the colony of Arvada III. A faction of the Romulan Star Empire wishes to keep the plague alive in an attempt to undermine newly appointed Romulan Praetor Tal'aura. Picard will be faced with working alongside allies new and old, as well as an enemy from the past who has a way of turning up when Picard least expects.

This book also includes characters Doctor Carter Greyhorse, a scientist whose past has landed him in a penal colony, along with Pug Joseph, a former member of Starfleet turned merchant, both of whom served with Picard aboard the USS Stargazer.

== Reception ==
Robert Lyons of TrekMovie.com complained that he struggled to even finish the book, only he had to write a review. He called it "an abysmal work – suffering from far too much formula and not enough creativity". Lyons criticized the prose, characterization, story, and the lack of focus on the crew of the Enterprise.
