= Wordos =

Writing workshop in Eugene, Oregon

The Wordos is a writing workshop based in Eugene, Oregon, United States. Its members meet once a week to critique stories and discuss the art, craft, and business of writing. It is a long running speculative fiction critique group and has a high concentration of published authors. However, having prior publishing credits is not a prerequisite to joining. The group has produced winners of the Galaxy Press international Writers of the Future contest six years in a row.

The group promotes itself as a means to help writers produce fiction of salable quality, and to continually improve their writing abilities. The workshop's primary focus is on short speculative fiction, but members have had fiction of other lengths and genres critiqued.

== History ==
Founded in 1987, "The Wordos" was originally called "The Eugene Professional Writers Workshops, Inc." The name was changed in 1995, to make it "shorter and friendlier." The name was suggested by someone and it stuck. The term infers people who work with words and in the writing world, has come to mean, "someone to keep an eye on". They kept the original name for business purposes, however. The group meets weekly in a local bookstore.

== Notable members ==
The membership over time has included, young adult and fantasy novelist Nina Kiriki Hoffman, surrealist short story writer and novelist Ray Vukcevich, science fiction writers Kathy Oltion and Jerry Oltion, Bruce Holland Rogers, Patricia Briggs, fiction and non-fiction writer Leslie What, Jay Lake, Eric M. Witchey, Devon Monk and many others. Deborah Layne, a long-time member, is also the founder of Wheatland Press, the award-winning publisher of the Polyphony anthology.

== Method ==
The Wordos follow the Clarion Workshop model of critiquing. A member reads a submitted story, writes comments on it, and then, on the evening of the workshop, speaks for one to three minutes offering those and other comments aloud. At the end of the evening, the critiqued story is given back to the author.

Members also report on news over the previous week, including accepted stories, rejections, and re-write requests from publishers.

== Awards ==
A member of the Wordos has won or placed in the L. Ron Hubbard Writers of the Future contest consistently since 2001. There have also been several Nebula Award-winning workshop members and members who have been nominated for or won the Endeavour Award, World Fantasy Award, and Philip K. Dick Award. One member, Marshall Moseley, was a finalist in the Bravo television series "Project Greenlight".

=== Partial list of award-winning stories ===
The following is a partial list of award-winning stories written by members of the Wordos:

Author	Story Title	Award	Year
Bruce Holland Rogers	"Hollywood Considered as a Seal Point in the Sun"	Muse Medallion for Short Story	1995
Bruce Holland Rogers	Lifeboat on a Burning Sea	Nebula Award for Novelette	1996
Bruce Holland Rogers	"Thirteen Ways to Water"	Nebula Award for Short Story	1998
Bruce Holland Rogers	"The Dead Boy at Your Window"	Bram Stoker Superior Achievement Award for Short Horror	1998
Bruce Holland Rogers	"The Dead Boy at Your Window"	Pushcart Prize	1999
Bruce Holland Rogers	N/A	Individual Artist Fellowship from the Oregon Arts Commission	1999
Bruce Holland Rogers	"Bitter Pills"	SF Age Readers' Poll; Best Short Story	1999
Bruce Holland Rogers	"Don Ysidro"	Winner, World Fantasy Award for Best Short Fiction	2004
Jerry Oltion	Abandon in Place	Nebula Award for Novella	1997
Jerry Oltion	The Astronaut from Wyoming (with Adam-Troy Castro)	Analog Readers' Choice Award for Novella	2000
Jerry Oltion	The Astronaut from Wyoming (with Adam-Troy Castro)	Seiun Award for Best Foreign Language Short Story of the Year	2007
Leslie What	"The Cost of Doing Business"	Nebula Award for Short Story	1999
Leslie What	"Why I Wash the Dead"	1st Place, Oregon Writers Colony Essay Contest	2000
Eric M. Witchey	Echo	New Century Writer Awards; 9th Place Novel	1999
Eric M. Witchey	"Dreams and Bones"	2nd Place, Writers of the Future Contest	Q3, 2001
Eric M. Witchey	"Life and Death and Stealing Toads"	1st Place, Ralan's Spectravaganza "Grabber" Contest	2003
Leon J. West	"Memoria Technica"	2nd Place, Writers of the Future Contest	Q4, 2002
Jay Lake	"Into the Gardens of Sweet Night"	1st Place, Writers of the Future Contest	Q4, 2003
Jay Lake	"Into the Gardens of Sweet Night"	John W. Campbell Award for Best New Writer	2004
Ken Brady	"Asleep in the Forest of the Tall Cats"	Published Finalist, Writers of the Future Contest	2004
Marshall Moseley	"Wildcard"	3rd Place Project Greenlight	2004
Stephen R. Stanley	"Mars Hath No Fury Like a Pixel Double-Crossed"	1st Place, Writers of the Future Contest	Q3, 2005
Blake Hutchins	"The Sword from the Sea"	1st Place, Writers of the Future Contest	Q2, 2006
Damon Kaswell	"Our Last Words"	3rd Place, Writers of the Future Contest	Q2, 2007
John Burridge	"Mask Glass Magic"	3rd Place, Writers of the Future Contest	Q4, 2007
Stephen R. Stanley	Illustrator	Winner, Illustrators of the Future Contest	Q1, 2008
Grá Linnaea	"Life In Steam"	3rd Place, Writers of the Future Contest	Q3, 2009
Jacob A. Boyd	"Lost Pine"	3rd Place, Writers of the Future Contest	Q3, 2011
