= Resistance (Dillard novel) =

Star Trek: The Next Generation novel

- Author: J.M. Dillard
- Cover artist: Tom Hallman
- Language: English
- Genre: Science fiction
- Publisher: Pocket Books
- Publication date: August 28, 2007
- Publication place: United States
- Media type: Print (Paperback)
- Pages: 306 pp
- ISBN: 0-7434-9955-7
- OCLC: 166322745
- LC Class: MLCS 2008/41628 (P)
- Preceded by: Death in Winter
- Followed by: Q & A

Resistance is a Star Trek: The Next Generation novel set after the 2002 film Star Trek: Nemesis, aboard the USS Enterprise-E written by J.M Dillard. Resistance is the second The Next Generation novel by Dillard, the first being Possession (1996) which was co-written with Kathleen O'Malley.

== Plot ==
Picard must rebuild his crew after the death of Data and departure of Capt. William Riker and Counselor Troi. Picard selects newly promoted, and acting first officer, Commander Worf as permanent first officer. A Vulcan, T'Lana, is granted commission as the Enterprise's new counselor. The captain is looking forward to putting the devastation of war behind him, shaping his new crew, building his relationship with Dr. Beverly Crusher and returning at last to being an explorer. Worf refuses the promotion and Picard senses his new counselor does not approve of Worf.

Quickly after being assigned a simple shakedown mission for the restored USS Enterprise-E, Picard once again begins hearing the voice of the Borg Collective. After reporting this to Starfleet, Admiral Janeway feels the Borg are decimated and are no longer a threat. Picard knows she is wrong and believes they are regrouping in the Alpha Quadrant for an annihilation-style attack on the Federation and all of the Alpha Quadrant's inhabitants.

== Reception ==
TrekMovie.com wrote: "While "Resistance" is enjoyable enough for what it is, I fear that Next Generation is suffering from a dry well." SFReader concluded: "Thus, we have another exceedingly average Next Generation novel that does manage to elevate itself to a higher level of average than Death in Winter did.
