= Star Trek: Strange New Worlds (short story collection) =

Short story anthology series

- Cover of Strange New Worlds (2016)
- Edited by: Dean Wesley Smith (1998–2007)
- Country: United States
- Language: English
- Genre: Science fiction
- Publisher: Simon & Schuster
- Published: 1998–2016
- Media type: Print (Paperback)
- No. of books: 11
- Website: startrekbooks.com

Star Trek: Strange New Worlds is a science fiction anthology series of licensed, fan-written, short stories based on, and inspired by, Star Trek and its spin-off television series and films. The series was published by Simon & Schuster, from 1996 to 2016, edited by Dean Wesley Smith, with assistance from John J. Ordover and Paula M. Block. The collected stories were submitted by amateur writers.

The series concluded in 2007. A new edition was announced in 2015, scheduled for release as part of Star Trek's 50th Anniversary Celebration.

== Production ==
The concept for the series was developed by John J. Ordover; to offer opportunities for amateur writers and fans to gain experience by submitting stories for publication, similar to the New Voyages books which were published by Bantam Books in the late 1970s. With the assistance of Paula M. Block, the director of Star Trek licensing at Paramount Pictures, legal questions were studied and submission guidelines for the stories were developed. Block had previously attempted to muster support for a continuation of The New Voyages format, but these efforts were not successful until her partnership with Ordover.

A contest format was chosen as the best method for encouraging submissions. Block and Ordover recruited established anthology editor Dean Wesley Smith to review and select stories for publication. Only residents of the United States and Canada, excluding Quebec, were able to submit stories. And each story had to be original—not formally published elsewhere. One of the terms of the contest required each story include established Star Trek characters created for any of the films or television series.

Winning submissions were written by Dayton Ward, Ilsa J. Bick, and Geoffrey Thorne, who each later published Star Trek novels. The fourth volume, Strange New Worlds IV (2001), included "jubHa'", a Klingon language story written by Lawrence Schoen. Schoen contributed to The Klingon Hamlet, which was reprinted by Pocket Books the same year.

In January 2007, Smith announced via his blog that "Ten years was enough. It was a fun ride." The series concluded with the tenth volume released July 2007.

Simon & Schuster and CBS revived the series as part of Star Trek's 50th Anniversary celebration. Smith was not involved; however, he discouraged submissions by amateur writers due to what he described as CBS's "onerous" licensing terms and submissions guidelines. The final volume was released as an ebook exclusive on October 3, 2016. No new editions have been announced as forthcoming by ViacomCBS or Simon & Schuster.

== Reception ==
Strange New Worlds (1998) was criticized for not including "much that's strange—or much that's new, either ... almost any fanzine, and many of the stories available on the Net, include material that's bolder and more speculative." "[F]airly entertaining stories" by Alara Rogers and Kathy Oltion, but the selection for Voyager-fans was not a "worthwhile investment."

Publishers Weekly described Strange New Worlds IV as "attractive not in spite of but because of readers' knowing how it will come out." The stories offered challenges for the characters "to let them show what they can do." However, the writers' "ingenuity is challenged as they speculate on the consequences of some detail while staying within the established history" of the Star Trek universe.

== Volumes ==
| Title | Editor | Date | ISBN |
|---|---|---|---|
| Strange New Worlds | Dean Wesley Smith | July 1998 | 0-671-01446-3 |
| Strange New Worlds II | Dean Wesley Smith | May 1999 | 0-671-02692-5 |
| Strange New Worlds III | Dean Wesley Smith | May 2000 | 0-671-03652-1 |
| Strange New Worlds IV | Dean Wesley Smith | May 8, 2001 | 0-7434-1131-5 |
| Strange New Worlds V | Dean Wesley Smith | May 28, 2002 | 0-7434-3778-0 |
| Strange New Worlds VI | Dean Wesley Smith | June 17, 2003 | 0-7434-6753-1 |
| Strange New Worlds VII | Dean Wesley Smith | June 29, 2004 | 0-7434-8780-X |
| Strange New Worlds 8 | Dean Wesley Smith | July 19, 2005 | 1-4165-0345-5 |
| Strange New Worlds 9 | Dean Wesley Smith | August 22, 2006 | 1-4165-2048-1 |
| Strange New Worlds 10 | Dean Wesley Smith | July 10, 2007 | 978-1-4165-4438-8 |
| Strange New Worlds 2016 (ebook) | (No editor credited) | October 3, 2016 | 978-1-5011-6158-2 |

== See also ==
- List of Star Trek novels
- The New Voyages
- Fan fiction
