= Off Centaur Publications =

- Genre: Filk
- Founded: 1980; United States
- Founder: Teri Lee; Jordin Kare; Catherine Cook
- Defunct: 1988
- Fate: Dissolved
- Successor: Firebird Arts and Music
- Headquarters: United States

Off Centaur Publications was the first "commercial" filk label. It was founded in 1980 by Teri Lee, Jordin Kare, and Catherine Cook, and was based in El Cerrito, California. The label produced high-quality filk recordings, changing the course of filk music. It was dissolved in 1988, and Teri Lee would go on to found Firebird Arts and Music.

Like some other filk labels, the name was a pun upon the idiom "off center," meaning eccentric, odd, or unusual—all of which could be considered legitimate characterizations of filk music. (Other filk labels have included Wail Songs, Unlikely Publications, and Random Factors, illustrating the style of self-deprecating humor common among these publishers).

Because of the dissolution, releases from this label are very difficult to find. At an Interfilk charity auction at FilKONtario, a copy of Julia Ecklar's Horse-Tamer's Daughter was sold for CA$400.00. Off Centaur tapes are considered "unobtainium" since few have been republished or re-created.

Off Centaur Publications was inducted into the Filk Hall of Fame in 1995. Lee and Kare died in 2021 and 2017.

== Notable albums and performers ==
- A Wolfrider's Reflections, Songs Of Elfquest, (1984), including songs by Mercedes Lackey, Leslie Fish, Cynthia McQuillin, and Julia Ecklar
- Cold Iron (1983) sung by Leslie Fish, lyrics by Rudyard Kipling
- The Best of Chi-con IV (1982) anthology, recorded live at the 1982 Worldcon
- Minus Ten and Counting: Songs of the Space Age(1983) including songs by Leslie Fish, Roy Torley, Julia Ecklar, Ross Douglas, Doug Olsen, Cynthia McQuillin, Catherine Cook, Sandy Rittenhouse, and George Spelvin
- Space Heroes & Other Fools (1983) by Julia Ecklar, Anne Harlan Prather, and Leslie Fish
- Horse-Tamer's Daughter (1983) by Julia Ecklar
- Singer in the Shadow (1983) by Cynthia McQuillin
- Captain Jack and the Mermaid (1984) by Meg Davis
- Lovers, Heroes & Rogues (1988) by Michael Longcor
- On a Bright Wind (1984) by Kathy Mar
- Murder, Mystery and Mayhem: Songs by Mercedes Lacke (1985) anthology, lyrics by Mercedes Lackey
- Past Due (1986) by Bill Sutton
- Rebel Yells (1986) anthology, recorded live at the 1986 Worldcon
- Where No Man... (1987) collection of Star Trek filk songs

== Songbooks ==
- Westerfilk Collection
- A Wolfrider's Reflections, Songs Of Elfquest (1984, 1987), edited by Teri Lee

== See also ==
- List of record labels
