= Kathy Oltion =

American novelist

Kathy Oltion is a science fiction novelist known primarily for her Star Trek work, which began with publication in the first two Strange New Worlds anthologies from Pocket Books ("See Spot Run" in the first, "The Quick and the Dead" in the second).

She also co-wrote the novel Star Trek: New Earth: The Flaming Arrow (Book Four of Six) with her husband, Jerry Oltion. Both authors live in Eugene, Oregon.

In addition to writing science fiction, Kathy Oltion also works in a medical laboratory.

She is a member of the Wordos writers' group.
