= Eric M. Witchey =

American novelist

- Born: June 10, 1958 (age 68)
- Education: Colorado State University (BA, MA)
- Occupation: Writer
- Writing career
- Language: English
- Genres: Speculative fiction, Horror fiction, Literary fiction, Science fiction, Crime fiction, Fantasy fiction, Romance fiction, Erotic fiction
- Website: ericwitchey.com

Eric M. Witchey (born June 10, 1958) is an American writer living in Salem, Oregon. As a communication consultant, he writes nonfiction. As a fiction writer, he has sold over 100 short stories and several novels. His fiction covers at least ten genres and has been published on five continents.

Witchey's articles on writing have appeared in The Writer, Writer's Digest, and other print and online magazines.

His short fiction has appeared in numerous print and online anthologies and magazines, such as Polyphony, The Best New Writing 2012, Low Port, Short Story America, Realms of Fantasy, Space Squid, Fortean Bureau, Thug Lit, ClarkesWorld, Jim Baen's Universe and Writers of the Future.

Witchey has won recognition and awards from New Century Writers, Writer's Digest, Writers of the Future, Ralan.com's Clincher Contest, Ralan.com's Grabber Contest, The Ralph Williams Memorial Award, and the Eric Hoffer Prose Award Program.

He has taught seminars at many conferences, including on the Greek island of Crete (Write in Crete, 2005) and near Lake Chapala in Mexico (The Lake Chapala Writer's Conference, 2012). Some of his works have been translated. Stories have appeared in Polish, German, Spanish, Italian, Chinese, and other languages.

In addition to teaching or writing, Witchey spends his time fly fishing or restoring antique, model locomotives.

== Awards and recognition ==
- 2014 – "Fitting for the Groom." Fourth Place. Spinetingler Magazine, UK. Dec. 2014.
- 2013 – "Forgotten Lore," Short Story America IV Anthology. Blind, international competition. Second Place Prize and Finalist for Short Story America Award
- 2013 – "Fly, Denora Bird," Short Story America IV Anthology. Blind, international competition. Finalist for Short Story America Award
- 2013 – "Cascade Sunrise," Short Story America IV Anthology. Blind, international competition. Finalist for Short Story America Award, *"For Your Entertainment," Third Place Winner of the Aeon Award 2012 Short Fiction Contest.
- 2012 – "Bosque Circular," Short Story America III Anthology. Third Place in the Short Story America Festival Contest. Sept. 2012. (print antho, e-antho, audio, e-single).
- 2012 – "The Cell Door Opens," Short Story America III Anthology. Top Ten in the Short Story America Festival Contest. Sept. 2012. (print antho, e-antho, audio, e-single).
- 2012 – Finalist for the Eric Hoffer Prose Award, 2011. "Reunion." Published in Best New Writing 2012.
- 2008 – Second Place in the Ralph Williams Memorial Short Story Contest. Science Fiction. "Ezekiel, Prophet to Bones."
- 2008 – Third Place in the Ralph Williams Memorial Short Story Contest. Science fiction. "Service."
- 2007 – Second Place 76th Annual Writer's Digest Short Fiction Contest Inspirational Category. "The Hero of Kill Devil Butte."
- 2005 – Judge: Ralan's Clincher Contest. www.ralan.com
- 2004 – Third Place www.ralan.com Grabber Contest; "Stealing Faith."
- 2003 – Honorable Mention Fantasist Contest, Dec. 2003. Accepted but not printed; "Purity of Blood and Courage."
- 2003 – Honorable Mention Writer's Digest Genre Short Story contest; "Badger Love"
- 2003 – Honorable Mention Writer's Digest Genre Short Story contest; "Bad Day Running Water to L.A.."
- 2003 – First Place www.ralan.com Grabber Contest; "Life and Death and Stealing Toads."
- 2001 – Honorable Mention Writer's Digest Genre Short Story contest; "Grandma Vernon's Cookies."
- 2000 – 2nd Place Writers of the Future Q3; "Dreams and Bones."
- 1999 – Semi-finalist Writers of the Future Q1; "For Your Entertainment."
- 1999 – 9th Place New Century Writers Novel Contest; "Echo."
- 2002 – Finalist Calendar.atEros Erotic Fiction Contest; "Diver's Moon."
- 1998 – Susan Petrey Award recipient, Clarion West.

== Published works ==
=== Novels ===
- Bull's Labyrinth, 2016
- How I Met My Alien Bitch Lover: Book 1 of the Sunny World Inquisition Daily Letter Archives', IFD Publications, 2012
- Beyond the Serpent’s Heart, IFD Publications, 2011
- Fighting Mother's Echo, Fantastyka Wydanie Specjalie (Poland), May, 2005
- Fighting Mother's Echo, New Century Writers Award, 1999
- Darwin's Silence excerpt, Clarion West attendance and scholarship
- Fighting Mother's Echo novel in-progress, Oregon Writer's Colony Anthology, In Our Own Voices 1998
- Fighting Mother's Echo novel in-progress, Oregon Writer's Colony Anthology, In Our Own Voices 1996

=== Short fiction: Literary/Little/Mainstream ===
- "Tequila Volcano," Timberline Review. Issue 1, Summer, 2015.
- "Goodbye Home," Independent Ink Magazine Issue 12, Jan. 2014. Print and online.
- "Co-dependent Spectral Disorder." Short Story America Anthology Vol. IV.
- "Fly, Denora Bird," Short Story America IV Anthology. Blind, international competition. Finalist for Short Story America Award, 2013. (print antho, e-antho, audio, e-single).
- "Forgotten Lore," Short Story America IV Anthology. Blind, international competition. Finalist and 2nd Place for Short Story America Award, 2013. (print antho, e-antho, audio, e-single).
- "Cascade Sunrise," Short Story America IV Anthology. Blind, international competition. Finalist for Short Story America Award, 2013. (print antho, e-antho, audio, e-single).
- "Bosque Circular," Short Story America III Anthology (2013). Third Place in the Short Story America Festival Contest. Sept. 2012. (print antho, e-antho, audio, e-single).
- "The Cell Door Opens," Short Story America III Anthology (2013). Top Ten in the Short Story America Festival Contest. Sept. 2012. (print antho, e-antho, audio, e-single).
- "The Apple Sniper." IFD Publishing stand-alone ebook. 2012.
- "Lost Island Story Hour." Short Story America II Anthology. 2012. (Online single, Online antho, Print antho, audio).
- "Reunion." Best New Writing 2012. Eric Hoffer Prose Award.
- "Mirages." The Writer Magazine web site. November, 2010
- "Mirages." Polyphony 7, July 2010. Only online.
- "The Hero of Kill Devil Butte." Second Place 76th Annual Writer's Digest Short Fiction Contest Inspirational Category, 2007.
- "Forgotten Lore." CDN Video presentation rights. June, 2006.
- "Daniel's Wagon." Up Lights Christmas Anthology, 2007. Purchased but not printed.
- "Mud Fork Cottonmouth Expedition." The Best of Polyphony, 2005. Accepted but not printed.
- "Mud Fork Cottonmouth Expedition." Polyphony 4. August, 2004.
- "The Runner" originally "Small Courages." American Intercultural Magazine (AIM) Spring, 2002.
- "Daniel's Wagon." printed in the One Evening a Year anthology published by the Eugene Professional Writer's Workshops, Inc.
- "Masquerade" Poem. American Poetry Anthology. 1983.

=== Short fiction: Science fiction ===
- "Vincent's First Bass." Daily Science Fiction eMagazine. Pub. Date TBA.
- "Vincent's First Bass." Daily Science Fiction Print Anthology. Pub. Date TBA.
- "For Your Entertainment." Third Place Winner of the Aeon Award 2012 Short Fiction Contest. Published in Albedo One Magazine in Ireland. Aug., 2013.
- "Beware the Boojum…" IFD Publishing stand-alone ebook novelette. 2013.
- "Brieanna's Constant." The Writer Magazine web site, accompaniment to the print article "Enriching Character through Simile, Metaphor, and Symbol. Oct, 2010.
- "Can You See Me Now?" Realms 2: The Second Year of Clarkesworld Magazine. Anthology. March, 2010
- "Ezekiel, Prophet to Bones." Second Place in the Ralph Williams Memorial Short Story Contest, 2008. Science Fiction.
- "Service." Third Place in the Ralph Williams Memorial Short Story Contest, 2008. Science fiction.
- "Can You See Me Now?" Clarkesworld Magazine. Autumn issue, 2008.
- "Men Are From Mars; Women Are Intravenous" Space Squid. April, 2008
- "Dreams and Bones." Nowa Fantastyka. Dec. 2007
- "Bibliophile." Nowa Fantastyka. July, 2007.
- "Running Water for L. A.." Jim Baen's Universe, Vol. 3, #1. June, 2007
- "Brieanna's Constant." Selected for Best of Jim Baen's Universe, 2006. Published, 2007.
- "Bibliophile." CDN Video presentation rights. June, 2006
- "Prime Time Religion." CDN Video presentation rights. June, 2006
- "Service." CDN Video presentation rights. June, 2006
- "Brieanna's Constant." Jim Baen's Universe Magazine, Vol. 1, Issue 1. May, 2006.
- "Christmas Eve on Able Flight." December, 2005. www.forteanbureau.com.
- "Voyeur." Meisha Merlin Press, Low Port Anthology. Summer, 2003
- "Bad Day Running Water to L.A.." Honorable Mention, Writer's Digest 2003 Genre Short Story contest.
- "Dreams and Bones." Writers of the Future Q3, 2000; L. Ron Hubbard presents The Writers of the Future. Anthology #17.
- "Prime Time Religion." sold but not printed; Eugene Register Guard
- "For Your Entertainment." Writers of the Future Honorable Mention Q1, 1999
- Echo. 9th Place, New Century Writer Novel Contest, 1999.

=== Short fiction: Fantasy ===
- "Circus Circus." Circus: Fantasy under the Big Top. Eketarina Sedia, ed. Prime Books. Oct. 2012.
- "To Build a Boat, Listen to Trees." IFD Publishing stand-alone ebook novelette. 2012.
- "Opacity and the Death Editor." w/ Alan M. Clark. Boneyard Babies. A Bizzaro Anthology. Eraserhead Press. Sept. 2010
- "Hold the Moon." Dark Wine and Stars anthology: Cat's Eye New Bella Anthology. June, 2010.
- "Conrad’s New Shoe Goo." Boneyard Babies. A Bizzaro Anthology. Eraserhead Press. Sept. 2010.
- "Circus Circus." Realms of Fantasy Magazine. February, 2007.
- "Christmas Spice Cookies." Up Lights Christmas Anthology for 2007 Holiday Season. Purchased but not printed.
- "Bat Baby and Big Foot vs. The Blood Trucking Vampire." CDN Video presentation rights. June, 2006.
- "Christmas Spice Cookies." Story House. December, 2005. Accepted again. Not printed.
- "Stealing Faith." www.ralan.com Spectravaganza anthology. Oct. 2003 (third place, Grabber Contest).
- "Life and Death and Stealing Toads." June, 2005. Nowa Fantastyka (Poland).
- "Batbaby and Bigfoot vs. The Blood Trucking Vampires." August, 2004. www.forteanbureau.com.
- "The Tao of Flynn." March, 2006. Nowa Fantastyka (Poland). Published 2005.
- "The Tao of Flynn." April, 2004 Realms of Fantasy Magazine.
- "Purity of Blood and Courage." Fantasists Anthology. December, 2003 Accepted. Not printed.
- "Christmas Spice Cookies." Story House. December, 2003 Accepted. Not printed.
- "Life and Death and Stealing Toads." www.ralan.com Spectravaganza anthology. Oct. 2003 (first place, Grabber Contest)
- "Hold the Moon." Vol. #4; Frequency Audio Magazine. Sold, Not Printed (SNP).
- "Hold the Moon." Kinships Magazine. Accepted. Not printed.
- "Lindeman's Life." June, 2002 Realms of Fantasy Magazine

=== Short fiction: Romance and erotica ===
- "Diver's Moon." IFD Publishing stand-alone short story. 2012. (Pen name: E.M. Arthur).
- "Seducing Storms." IFD Publishing stand-alone short story. 2012. (Pen name: E.M. Arthur).
- "Roxie’s Jackhammer." Oysters and Chocolate online Magazine. Sept. 2010. (Pen name: E.M. Arthur)
- "Nan and the New Spinners." Moon Washed Kisses. Sept. 2010. (Pen name: E.M. Arthur)
- "She Blossoms in Mine Tailings." Quantum Kiss Online Magazine.
- "Diver's Moon." The Mammoth Books Best New Erotica 3. (Pen name: E.M. Arthur)
- "Grandma Vernon's Cookies." Short Stuff for Adults Magazine. Valentine's Day issue, Feb. 2003.
- "Badger Love." Honorable Mention, Writer's Digest 2003 Genre Short Story contest.
- "Diver's Moon." e-book anthology. December, 2002, Calendar.atEros. (Pen name: E.M. Arthur).
- "Seducing Storms." The Mammoth Books Best New Erotica 2. (Pen name: E.M. Arthur).
- "Seducing Storms." Clean Sheets online magazine; April, 2001. (Pen name: E.M. Arthur).
- "Grandma Vernon's Cookies." Honorable Mention, Writer's Digest 2001 Genre Short Story contest.

=== Short fiction: Horror ===
- "Fitting for the Groom." Fourth Place. Spinetingler Magazine, UK. Dec. 2014.
- "Scare Tactic." Dark Discoveries Magazine. 2007
- "Collaboration." Poem. Surreal Magazine. September, 2005
- "The Fix in Mr. Giovelli's Bandit." TripleTree Press. Ghosts at the Coast anthology, 2005
- "Confession for a Heart of Stone." Fortean Bureau. Oct. 2003.

=== Short fiction: Other ===
- "On The Program." Thug Lit. www.Thuglit.com, 2006.
- "The Golden Spike." Lost Treasures Magazine, 1987.
- "Wheel of Fortune." CICADA Magazine. Accepted but not printed.

== Education ==
Witchey is a graduate of Clarion West Writers Workshop 1998.

Witchey is a graduate of Colorado State University: BA, 1985. MA (CD), 1988.

Witchey is a graduate of Shelby Senior High 1976.
