= Star Trek: New Earth =

Series of Star Trek novels

- Cover of the 2000 novel Wagon Train to the Stars.
- Wagon Train to the Stars (2000); Belle Terre (2000); Rough Trails (2000); The Flaming Arrow (2000); Thin Air (2000); Challenger (2000)
- Author: Various
- Country: United States
- Language: English
- Genre: Science fiction
- Publisher: Pocket Books
- Published: 2000
- Media type: Print (Paperback)
- No. of books: 6
- Preceded by: My Brother's Keeper
- Followed by: The Eugenics Wars
- Website: startrekbooks.com

Star Trek: New Earth is a series of American interlinked science fiction novels inspired by Gene Roddenberry's original pitch for Star Trek: "Wagon Train to the Stars." Created by John J. Ordover, the novels follow the crew of the Enterprise as they escort a colonial expedition into a hostile region of unexplored space.

The novels occur during the second five-year mission, sometime between the episode "Turnabout Intruder" and Star Trek: The Motion Picture. The series was intended to be the springboard for a flagship new book line similar to Star Trek: New Frontier, called Star Trek: Challenger.

== Production ==
John J. Ordover told Jeff Ayers, in Voyages of Imagination (2006), the concept for New Earth originated as "a personal reaction to Voyager." He believed there was no stakes for those characters, no "emotional tie" to the region that ship was passing through. Ordover asked, “What if you went outside the known galaxy or outside the common area to find a new colony and you were assigned to stay there and protect them for a while?” His answer was the concept for New Earth.

=== Wagon Train to the Stars (2000) ===
Star Trek: New Earth – Wagon Train to the Stars by Diane Carey, who also told Ayers that Ordover wanted a “new captain, new ship, new crew, and new situation, bringing Star Trek back to the original concept of ‘being out there’ with limited contact, essentially in a wild west town and having to fake it, hacking our way to civilization the hard way.” Carey and her husband, Greg Brodeur, developed the series concept. Carey wrote the first and sixth novels in the succession.

=== Belle Terre (2000) ===
Star Trek: New Earth – Belle Terre, the second novel, was to be written by Carey. However, Ordover recruited Dean Wesley Smith to complete the novel based on Carey's outline.

=== Rough Trails (2000) ===
Star Trek: New Earth – Rough Trails, co-written by Julia Ecklar and Karen Rose Cercone as L.A. Graf, was inspired by the Johnstown Flood.

=== The Flaming Arrow (2000) ===
Star Trek: New Earth – The Flaming Arrow was co-written by Jerry Oltion and with his wife Kathy. They found the experience of writing a multi-author series difficult, saying: “It felt like we were building a bridge between two shores that were both shrouded in fog, while trolls were busy knocking out the supports from under us. The last-minute changes kept rolling in, so we did the only prudent thing we could do: We finished our book first so everybody else would have to follow our lead from then on.”

=== Thin Air (2000) ===
Star Trek: New Earth – Thin Air was co-written by husband-and-wife Kristine Kathryn Rusch and Dean Wesley Smith. Smith told Ayers, the novel was "a fun idea … foam covering a planet as a way to attack it." He also said he "had a blast" writing the developing and writing the novel.

=== Challenger (2000) ===
Star Trek: New Earth – Challenger was written as a possible introduction to a new book series. The namesake flagship was named in honor of the Space Shuttle Challenger by Ordover.

=== Chainmail (2001) ===
Star Trek: Challenger – Chainmail, by Diane Carey, is the second novel of the Gateways (2001) crossover series, and it was intended to be the introduction of a new flagship series similar to New Frontier by Peter David. Chainmail is a direct sequel to Challenger (2000), and includes characters and settings from other New Earth novels. The novel is often erroneously cataloged as the seventh volume in the New Earth series. The titular flagship is the UFPF Challenger (OV91951L), a Mongrel-class frigate assembled from the multifarious vessels used to transport colonists to Belle Terre. Only one Challenger novel has been published.

== Reception ==
Michelle Green of Little Review wrote, New Earth was "fun to read, with several compelling plots unfolding at once[,] and the original Enterprise crew having a lot of fun in between heroics."

Jeff Millward commented Challenger was, "a pretty good ending to an extremely long series." However, his wish was that "nobody writes a story that spans [six] novels again" after offering less enthusiastic reviews for the previous books in the series. Randall Landers of Orion Press praised Carey's abilities as a storyteller, in Challenger. But, he noted, Carey's "purple prose" limited the appeal of the novel.

== Novels ==
No.	Title	Author(s)	Released	ISBN
1	Wagon Train to the Stars	Diane Carey	June 2000	0-671-04296-3
2	Belle Terre	Dean Wesley Smith and Diane Carey	June 2000	0-671-04297-1
3	Rough Trails	L.A. Graf	July 2000	0-671-03600-9
4	The Flaming Arrow	Kathy Oltion and Jerry Oltion	July 2000	0-671-78562-1
5	Thin Air	Kristine Kathryn Rusch and Dean Wesley Smith	August 2000	0-671-78577-X
6	Challenger	Diane Carey	August 2000	0-671-04298-X

== Gateways miniseries ==
Characters and settings from the New Earth appear in two entries of the Gateways crossover miniseries:

No.	Title	Author(s)	Released	ISBN
2	Chainmail (Challenger, Book 1)	Diane Carey	July 31, 2001	0-7434-1855-7
7	What Lay Beyond (anthology) — "Exodus" by Diane Carey	John J. Ordover, ed.	October 30, 2001	0-7434-3112-X

== See also ==
- List of Star Trek novels
- Star Trek: New Frontier
