= Star Trek: Klingon Empire =

Novel series by Keith DeCandido

- Cover of A Burning House (2008)
- A Good Day to Die (2003); Honor Bound (2003); Enemy Territory (2005); A Burning House (2008)
- Author: Keith DeCandido
- Country: United States
- Language: English
- Genre: Science fiction
- Publisher: Pocket Books
- Published: 2003–2008
- Media type: Print (Paperback)
- No. of books: 4
- Website: startrekbooks.com

Star Trek: Klingon Empire is a series of interlinked Klingon-centric Star Trek novels written by Keith DeCandido. The series was published by Pocket Books from 2003 to 2008.

Originally published as Star Trek: I.K.S. Gorkon.

== Production ==
Following positive reaction to his novel Diplomatic Implausibility (2001), DeCandido was curious if there was sufficient interest in a Klingon-centric series. In Voyages of Imagination (2009) by Jeff Ayers, DeCandido said "Pocket Books … was willing to take a chance." He had "already set it up" in Diplomatic Implausibility and The Brave and the Bold, Book Two (2002), so he "took it forward" with two novels. A third novel followed in 2005.

In 2008, the series was relaunched as Klingon Empire. The scope of A Burning House expanded the setting beyond the crew aboard the Gorkon.

Members of Gorkon crew appear in the Destiny (2008) miniseries, by David Mack, and in A Singular Destiny (2008), by DeCandido.

Only one relaunch novel has been published, though representatives of Simon & Schuster suggested new 'Klingon' novels were forthcoming as late as 2012. DeCandido explained in numerous interviews he has not queried new novels for the series since he submitted the un-related short story "The Unhappy Ones", later collected in Seven Deadly Sins (2010).

== Flagship ==
The IKS Gorkon is a Qang-class, or Chancellor-class, war cruiser named for Chancellor Gorkon first introduced in The Undiscovered Country (1991). The cruiser is 500 m (1,600 ft) in length, and carries a complement of over 2,000 crew. When launched, the Gorkon, was among the first of the Qang-class cruisers in service.

A Good Day to Die (2003) begins sometime after Chancellor Martok ordered the Gorkon to the Kavrot Sector—an unexplored region of space—with the objective of finding new planets to conquer for the glory of the Empire.

Captain Klag, captain of the Gorkon, was introduced in The Next Generation episode "A Matter of Honor".

== Novels ==
All novels written by Keith DeCandido.

=== I.K.S. Gorkon (2003–2005) ===
No.	Title	Date	ISBN
1	A Good Day to Die	October 28, 2003	0-7434-5714-5
2	Honor Bound	November 25, 2003	0-7434-5716-1
3	Enemy Territory	March 1, 2005	1-4165-0014-6

=== Klingon Empire (2008) ===
Title	Date	ISBN
A Burning House	January 29, 2008	978-1-4165-5647-3

== Short fiction ==
Captain Klag's history was the subject of three short stories, with one set in the Mirror Universe. All were written by Keith DeCandido.

Work	Collection	Editor(s)	Date	ISBN
"A Song Well Sung"	Tales of the Dominion War	Keith DeCandido	August 3, 2004	0-7434-9171-8
"loDnI‘pu‘ vavpu‘ je"	Tales from the Captain's Table	Keith DeCandido	June 14, 2005	1-4165-0520-2
"Family Maters"	Shards and Shadows (Mirror Universe)	Marco Palmieri and Margaret Clark	January 6, 2009	978-1-4165-5850-7

== Related novels ==
Novels that contain links to the series. The Gorkon and her crew were introduced in Diplomatic Implausibility (2003).

Title	Date	ISBN
Diplomatic Implausibility (The Next Generation, Book 61)	January 30, 2001	0-671-78554-0
The Brave and the Bold, Book Two	November 26, 2002	0-7434-1923-5
Articles of the Federation	May 24, 2005	1-4165-0015-4
A Singular Destiny	January 27, 2009	978-1-4165-9495-6

=== Destiny (2008) ===
Star Trek: Destiny crossover miniseries explores the origin of the Borg, and the Federation's response to a destructive invasion by them.

No.	Title	Author	Date	ISBN
1	Gods of Night	David Mack	September 30, 2008	978-1-4165-5171-3
2	Mere Mortals	David Mack	October 28, 2008	978-1-4165-5172-0
3	Lost Souls	David Mack	November 25, 2008	978-1-4165-5175-1

== See also ==
- Klingon
- Dominion War
- List of Star Trek novels
