= Diane Carey =

American writer

Diane L. Carey-Brodeur
- Born: Diane L. Carey; October 2, 1954 (age 71); Flint, Michigan, U.S.
- Occupation: Novelist
- Spouse: Gregory E. Brodeur
- Children: 3
- Writing career
- Pen name: Lydia Gregory, Diane Carey, D. L. Carey
- Language: English
- Period: 1982–present
- Genre: fiction
- Subjects: science fiction, historical romance
- Notable work: Star Trek Novels

Diane L. Carey-Brodeur (born October 2, 1954) is an American fiction writer, publishing under the pen names Lydia Gregory, Diane Carey, and D. L. Carey.

== Background ==
Diane L. Carey was born on October 2, 1954, in Flint, Michigan, United States. She married Gregory E. "Greg" Brodeur, an editor, and they had three children: Lydia, Gordon, and Ben. The family lives in Michigan.

Carey's first publication was a romance novel written under the pseudonym of Lydia Gregory. Her later writings have been published under two variants of her maiden name: Diane Carey and D. L. Carey. She has also written children's novels, but is best known for her work in the Star Trek franchise. She has been the lead-off writer for two Star Trek spin-off book series: Star Trek: The Next Generation with Star Trek: Ghost Ship, and the novelization of the Star Trek: Enterprise pilot, Broken Bow. Carey's literary work has been recognized and highlighted at Michigan State University in their Michigan Writers Series.

== Bibliography ==
=== As Lydia Gregory ===
==== Historical romance novels ====
- Unwilling Enchantress (1982)

=== As Diane Carey ===
==== Historical romance novels ====
- Silver Season (1985)
- Harem (1986)
- Under the Wild Moon (1986)
- After the Torchlight (1986)
- Sudden Storm (1990)
- Rose Legacy (1992; 2014)

==== Star Trek original series ====
- Dreadnought! (1986; 2000) #29; Fortunes of War #1
- Battlestations! (1986) #31; Fortunes of War #2
- Final Frontier (1988)
- Best Destiny (1992)
- The Great Starship Race (1993; 2000) #67
- First Frontier (1995; 2000) #75; co-author Dr. James I. Kirkland
- Invasion!: Book One of First Strike (1996; 2012) in Star Trek: Adventures In Time And Space! edited by Mary P. Taylor
- Cadet Kirk (1996) Starfleet Academy #3
- Starfleet Academy (1997)
- Wagon Train to the Stars (2000) #89; New Earth #1
- Belle Terre (2000; 2012) #90; New Earth #2; co-author Dean Wesley Smith
- Challenger (2000) #94; New Earth #6
- Chainmail (2001) Gateways #2
- What Lay Beyond (2001) Gateways #7; co-authors Peter David, Keith R. A. DeCandido, Christie Golden, Robert Greenberger, and Susan Wright

==== Star Trek: The Next Generation series ====
- Ghost Ship (1988) #1
- Descent (1993; 2000) (novelization)
- Ship of the Line (1997; 2000)
- Ancient Blood (1997; 2002) Day of Honor #1
- Red Sector (1999; 2002) Double Helix #3

==== Star Trek Deep Space Nine series ====
- The Search (1994; 2000) (novelization)
- Station Rage (1995; 2000) #13
- The Way of the Warrior (1995; 2000) (novelization)
- Trials and Tribble-ations (1996; 2000) co-author David Gerrold (novelization)
- Call to Arms (1998) The Dominion War #2
- ...Sacrifice of Angels (1998) The Dominion War #4
- What You Leave Behind (1999) (novelization)

==== Star Trek Voyager series ====
- Flashback (1996; 2002) co-author Brannon Braga (novelization)
- Fire Ship (1998) novella in collection Star Trek: The Captain's Table (1998)
- Equinox (1999) (novelization)
- Endgame (2001) (novelization) co-author Christie Golden (not to be confused with End Game by Peter David)
- Unimatrix Zero (2001) (novelization)

==== Star Trek Enterprise series ====
- Broken Bow (2001) (novelization)

==== Aliens series ====
- DNA War (2006)
- Cauldron (2007)

==== Movie novelizations ====
- S.W.A.T (2003)

=== As D. L. Carey ===
==== Civil War series (historical romance novels) ====
1. Distant Drums (1991)
2. Rise Defiant (1991)

==== Distress Call 911 series (young adult novels) ====
1. Twist of Fate (1996)
2. Buried Alive (1996)
3. Danger Zone (1996)
4. Worth Dying For (1996)
5. Million Dollar Mistake (1996)
6. Roughing It (1996)
7. Promise Me You'll Stop Me (1996)

=== Other ===
- Do You Have a Beaumont Doctor? (2011, 2013) with Ananias C. Diokno
- How to Help Stray Pets and Not Get Stuck (2013)
- Banners (2014)
