= Julia Ecklar =

American writer

Julia Ecklar (born 1964) is an American science fiction author as well as a singer and writer of filk music. Her written works include multiple Star Trek novels, written under her own name as well as the collective pen name L.A. Graf. The pen name L.A. Graf reportedly stands for "Let's All Get Rich And Famous."

Ecklar recorded numerous albums with the Off Centaur label in the early 1980s, including Minus Ten and Counting, Horse-Tamer's Daughter, and Genesis. Her Divine Intervention album, released in 1986, was the first filk genre release to combine orchestral and progressive rock arrangements. Songs on the album were inspired by science-fiction and fantasy films such as Star Trek III and Ladyhawke. Ecklar's 2013 album, Horsetamer (produced by Michael Moricz), was her first solo album in 25 years.

== L.A. Graf ==
L.A. Graf is a pseudonym for the writing team formed by Ecklar, Karen Rose Cercone, and Melissa Crandall for the 1992 Star Trek novel #60 Ice Trap. For all later L.A. Graf novels, the writing team was a partnership between Ecklar and Cercone. L.A. Graf reportedly stands for "Let's All Get Rich and Famous". As L.A. Graf, Ecklar and Cercone wrote or contributed to over twenty Star Trek novels.

== Bibliography ==
=== As Julia Ecklar ===
==== Star Trek tie-ins ====
- The Kobayashi Maru (1989) Pocket Books: Star Trek #47, ISBN 0-671-65817-4

==== Standalone work ====
- "The Music Box" (Analog, September 1989)
- "Carmen Miranda and the Maracas of Death" (Carmen Miranda's Ghost Is Haunting Space Station Three, 1990 anthology, ISBN 0-671-69864-8)
- "Extra Ellies" (Analog, May 1990)
- "Burning Bridges" (Analog, November 1990)
- "A Sweet Disorder" (Analog, September 1991)
- Noah's Ark series
  - "Blood Relations" (Analog, June 1992)
  - "Ice Nights" (Analog, October 1992)
  - "Tide of Stars" (Analog, January 1995)
  - "The Human Animal" (Analog, April 1995)
- "Promised Lives" (Fantasy & Science Fiction, September 1993)
- ReGenesis (1995) Ace Books, ISBN 0-441-00189-0
- "Thylacine Dream" (Otherwere: Stories of Transformation, 1996 anthology) ISBN 0-441-00363-X

=== As L.A. Graf ===
==== Star Trek tie-ins and novelisations ====
- Ice Trap (July 1992) Star Trek #60, ISBN 0-671-78068-9
- Death Count (November 1992) Star Trek #62, ISBN 0-671-79322-5
- Firestorm (January 1994) Star Trek #68, ISBN 0-671-86588-9
- Traitor Winds (June 1994) Star Trek #70, ISBN 0-671-86913-2
- Caretaker (February 1995) Star Trek: Voyager #1, ISBN 0-671-51914-X
- Star Trek: Envoy (April 1995) audiobook narrated by George Takei, ISBN 9780743542555
- Time's Enemy (August 1996) Star Trek: DS9 #16, ISBN 0-671-65817-4
- Armageddon Sky (September 1997) Star Trek: Day of Honor #2, ISBN 0-671-00675-4
- War Dragons (June 1998) Star Trek: The Captain's Table #1, ISBN 0-671-01463-3
- "Reflections" (The Lives of Dax, 1999 anthology) ISBN 0-671-02840-5
- Rough Trails (July 2000) Star Trek: New Earth Book Three, ISBN 0-671-86913-2
- The Janus Gate (October 2002 omnibus) ISBN 0-7394-2854-3
  1. Present Tense (June 2002) ISBN 0-671-03635-1
  2. Future Imperfect (June 2002) ISBN 0-671-03636-X
  3. Past Prologue (July 2002) ISBN 0-7434-4596-1

==== Alien Nation tie-in ====
Extreme Prejudice (March 1995) Alien Nation #7, ISBN 0-671-79570-8

==== Standalone work ====
Phobos Rising: A Living Mars Novel (September 2007)

== Discography ==
- To Touch the Stars: A Musical Celebration of Space Exploration (contributor)
- Minus Ten and Counting (contributor)
- Traveller (re-released on CD in 2006)
- Genesis (out of print)
- Divine Intervention (Prometheus Music, 1986)
- Walkabout (Dodeka Records)
- Balance (DAG Productions)
- Space Heroes & Other Fools (contributor, 1983)
- Horsetamer's Daughter (Off Centaur Publications, 1983)
- A Wolfrider's Reflections (Warp Graphics, 1987)
- Horsetamer (Prometheus Music, 2013)

== Awards ==
- John W. Campbell Award for Best New Writer 1991
- Inducted into the Filk Hall of Fame 1996
- Pegasus Awards
  - Best Female Filker 1984
  - Best Performer 1987
  - Best Writer/Composer 1990
  - Best Literature Song 1990: "Daddy's Little Girl"
  - Best War/Vengeance Song 1991: "Temper of Revenge"
  - Best Filk Song 1992: "God Lives on Terra"
  - Best Sorcery Song 1997: "The Dark Is Rising" (with Susan Cooper)
  - Best Classic Filk Song 2004: "Ladyhawke!"
  - Best Classic Filk Song 2011: "The Phoenix"

== See also ==
- List of Star Trek novels
