= Star Trek: Stargazer =

Novel series by Michael Jan Friedman

- Gauntlet (2002); Progenitor (2002); Three (2003); Oblivion (2003); Enigma (2004); Maker (2004)
- Author: Michael Jan Friedman
- Language: English
- Genre: Science fiction
- Publisher: Pocket Books
- Published: 2002–2004
- No. of books: 6
- Website: startrekbooks.com

Star Trek: Stargazer is a flagship series of Star Trek tie-in novels written by Michael Jan Friedman. The series is set several decades prior to The Next Generation and follows the exploits of Jean-Luc Picard during the period of his first command, the USS Stargazer (NCC-2893).

== Characters ==
Many of the characters originally appeared in Friedman's 1992 novel Reunion (ISBN 0-671-78755-1).

Main characters in the Stargazer crew include:

- Captain Jean-Luc Picard, commanding officer of USS Stargazer
- Lieutenant Commander Gilaad Ben Zoma, first officer
- Lieutenant Commander Jack Crusher
- Lieutenant Commander Elizabeth Wu
- Lieutenant Gerda Asmund
- Lieutenant Idun Asmund
- Lieutenant Nol Kastiigan
- Ensign Cole Paris (uncle of Tom Paris)
- Dikembe Ulelo
- Lieutenant Vigo
- Lieutenant Phigus Simenon
- Lieutenant Bill Refsland
- Lieutenant Peter Joseph
- Lieutenant Obal
- Ensign Andreas Nikolas
- Crewperson Emily Bender
- Ensign Jiterica
- Carter Greyhorse

== Novels ==
No.	Title	Author	Date	ISBN
1	Gauntlet	Michael Jan Friedman	April 30, 2002	0-7434-2792-0
2	Progenitor	Michael Jan Friedman	April 30, 2002	0-7434-2794-7
3	Three	Michael Jan Friedman	July 29, 2003	0-7434-4852-9
4	Oblivion	Michael Jan Friedman	August 26, 2003	0-7434-4854-5
5	Enigma	Michael Jan Friedman	July 27, 2004	0-7434-4856-1
6	Maker	Michael Jan Friedman	August 31, 2003	0-7434-4858-8

=== Related novels ===
Novels and short fiction which include settings and characters from Stargazer.

Title	Author	Date	ISBN
Encounter at Farpoint (novelization) (The Next Generation)	David Gerrold	September 1987	0-671-65241-9
Reunion (The Next Generation)	Michael Jan Friedman	November 1991	0-671-74808-4
Requiem (The Next Generation, Book 32)	Michael Jan Friedman and Kevin Ryan	October 1994	0-671-79567-8
The First Virtue (The Next Generation, Book 56 – Double Helix, Book 6)	Michael Jan Friedman and Christie Golden	August 1999	0-671-03258-5
The Valiant (The Next Generation)	Michael Jan Friedman	April 2000	0-671-77522-7
Pantheon (omnibus)	Michael Jan Friedman	September 16, 2003	0-7434-8511-4
Tales of the Dominion War (anthology) – "What Dreams May Come" by Michael Jan Friedman	Keith DeCandido, ed.	August 3, 2004	0-7434-9171-8
Tales from the Captain's Table (anthology) – "Darkness" by Michael Jan Friedman	Keith DeCandido, ed.	June 14, 2005	1-4165-0520-2
Death in Winter (The Next Generation)	Michael Jan Friedman	September 20, 2005	0-7434-9721-X
Shards and Shadows (anthology) – "The Traitor" by Michael Jan Friedman (Mirror Universe)	Marco Palmieri and Margaret Clark, eds.	January 20, 2009	978-1-4165-5850-7
The Buried Age (The Next Generation)	Christopher L. Bennett	June 26, 2007	978-1-4165-3739-7

== See also ==
- List of Star Trek novels
- List of Star Trek: The Next Generation novels
