= Jerry Oltion =

American novelist

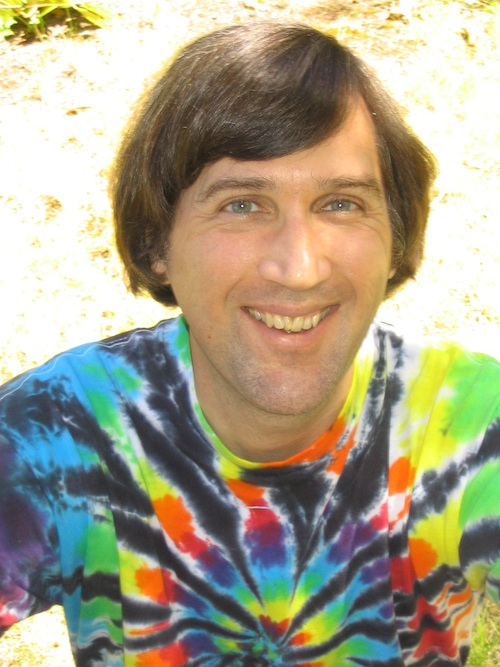
- Born: 1957 (age 68–69)
- Occupation: Author
- Writing career
- Genre: Science fiction
- Notable awards: Nebula Award for Best Novella (1998); Seiun Award (2007)
- Website: www.jerryoltion.com

Jerry Oltion (born 1957) is an American science fiction author from Eugene, Oregon, known for numerous novels and short stories, including books in the Star Trek series. He is a member of the Wordos writers' group and also writes under the pen name "Ryan Hughes."

== Writing career ==
His novels include Frame of Reference (1987), Abandon in Place (2000), The Getaway Special (2001), Paradise Passed (2004), and Anywhere but Here (2005). His work has been compiled in the collections, Love Songs of a Mad Scientist: The Collected Stories of Jerry Oltion Volume One (1993), Singing in the Rain, The Collected Stories of Jerry Oltion Volume Two (1998), and Twenty Questions (2003). He contributed to Isaac Asimov's Robot City series with the books Alliance and Humanity (both in 1990). His work can also be found in numerous anthologies, such as Quest to Riverworld (1993) and Tales from the Mos Eisley Cantina (1995).

As of November 2011, Oltion became the most published fiction author in the history of Analog magazine, with 84 stories. He has since attained over 98 as of March 2021.

Oltion has also written several Star Trek novels, including Twilight's End (1995), Mudd in your Eye (1996), and the New Earth novel, The Flaming Arrow (2000), the latter written in collaboration with his wife, Kathy. He also wrote a novel in Star Trek's Captain's Table series, Where Sea Meets Sky (1998).

== Astronomy ==
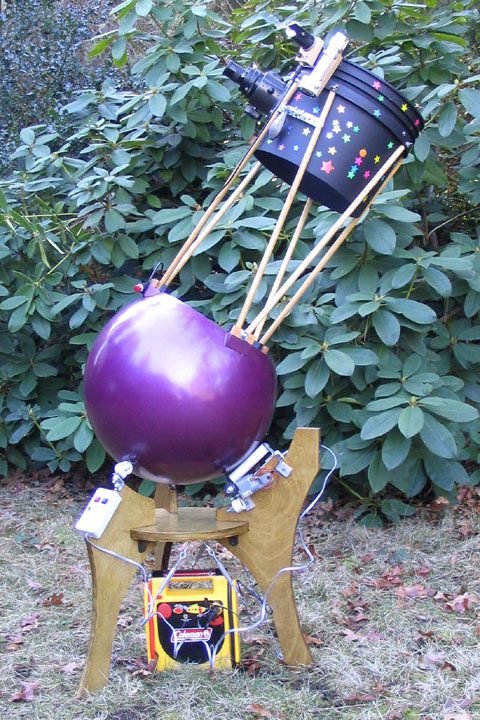
Trackball Telescope

Oltion is the designer of the trackball telescope, a light weight equatorial mounting system with an electromechanical star tracking drive. He publicly described the trackball in the August 2006 issue of Sky and Telescope magazine, and on his website. He placed the patent-able portions of his design in the public domain, making them more easily accessible to other telescope makers.

In June 2016 Oltion became a contributing editor at Sky and Telescope magazine, writing the monthly Astronomer's Workbench column.

== Awards ==
Oltion won the 1998 Nebula Award for Best Novella for "Abandon in Place". He was also nominated for the Nebula Award two other times, for his 1993 novella "Contact", and his 2000 novella, "The Astronaut from Wyoming".

He won the 2006 Endeavor Award for best novel by a Northwest Author ("Anywhere But Here").

He was also nominated twice for the Hugo Awards for Best Novella, first for "Abandon in Place" in 1997, and then for "The Astronaut from Wyoming" in 2000, but did not win either time.

In 2007, Oltion and Adam-Troy Castro won the Seiun Award for Best Foreign Language Short Story of the Year for "The Astronaut from Wyoming."

== Bibliography ==
=== Novels ===
- Frame of reference. 1987.
- Mission Starchild. 1994.
- The darkness before the dawn. 1995.
- Abandon in place. 2000.
- The getaway special. 2001.
- Paradise passed. 2004.
- Anywhere but here. 2005.

Star Trek

- Twilight's end. 1996.
- Mudd in your eye. 1997.
- Where Sea Meets Sky (1998)
- The Flaming Arrow (with Kathy Oltion, 2000)

Robots City

- Alliance (Isaac Asimov's Robots and Aliens No. 4, 1990)
- Humanity (Isaac Asimov's Robots and Aliens No. 6, 1990

=== Short fiction ===
Collections

- Love Songs of a Mad Scientist (1993)
- Singing in the Rain (1998)
- With Stars in their Eyes (with Adam-Troy Castro, 2003)
- Twenty Questions (2003)

Short stories

- "Abridged edition" F&SF 87/1 [518] (Jul 1994)
- "Away in a manger" Analog 115/15 (mid-Dec 1995)
- "Biosphere" F&SF 96/6 [574] (Jun 1999)
- "Course changes" Analog 113/11 (Sep 1993)
- "Crackers" Analog 127/4 (Apr 2007)
- "Dedication" Analog 113/12 (Oct 1993)
- "Deus X" with Kristine Kathryn Rusch F&SF 93/4-5 [556] (Oct/Nov 1997)
- "The difference between science fiction and fantasy: a mathematical analysis" F&SF 92/3 [549] (Mar 1997)
- "Dutchman's gold" with Kent Patterson F&SF 89/3 [532] (Sep 1995)
- "Fermat's lost theorem" Analog 114/15 (mid-Dec 1994)
- "The firefly farce" Analog 114/6 (May 1994): 75–81
- "The grass is always greener" F&SF 84/2 [501] (Feb 1993)
- "The great Martian pyramid hoax" F&SF 88/1 [524] (Jan 1995)
- "Holiday spirits" Analog 117/1 (Jan 1997)
- "If only we knew" Analog 127/1&2 (Jan/Feb 2007)
- "In the autumn of the Empire" Analog 129/10 (Oct 2009)
- "The jolly old boyfriend" Analog 129/12 (Dec 2009)
- "A jug of wine and thou" Analog 129/4 (Apr 2009)
- "The love song of Laura Morrison" Analog
- "The miracle" F&SF 95/6 [568] (Dec 1998)
- "A new generation" Analog 128/1&2 (Jan/Feb 2008)
- "Outside the box" Analog 128/7&8 (Jul–Aug 2008
- "The Pandora probe" Analog 114/14 (Dec 1994)
- "The plight before Christmas" F&SF 90/1 [536] (Jan 1996)
- "Salvation" Analog 127/12 (Dec 2007)
- "Schrödinger's kiln" Analog 115/3 (Feb 1995)
- "The Seeds of Time" Bones of the World: Tales from Time's End (2001)
- "Space aliens taught my dog to knit" Analog 130/6 (Jun 2010) (with Elton Elliott)
- "There goes the neighbourhood" F&SF 91/2 [543] (Aug 1996)
- "Uncertainty" F&SF 89/6 [535] (Dec 1995)
- "Waterworld" with Lee Goodloe Analog 114/4 (Mar 1994)
- "When we were fab" Analog 130/4 (Apr 2010)
- "Much Ado About Nothing" Analog 102/12 (Nov 1982)
- "If a Tree Doesn't Fall" Analog 141/3-4 (Mar/Apr 2021)

Title	Year	First published	Reprinted/collected	Notes
Abandon in place	1996	"Abandon in place". The Magazine of Fantasy & Science Fiction. 91 (6 [546]). December 1996.		
In the moment	2013	"In the moment". Analog Science Fiction and Fact. 133 (1&2): 8–13. January–February 2013.		
Our new overlords	2014	"Our new overlords". Probability Zero. Analog Science Fiction and Fact. 134 (5): 48–49. May 2014.		
The pain in the ass	2000	"The pain in the ass". The Magazine of Fantasy & Science Fiction. 99 (2): 33–43. August 2000.		
Why the Titanic hit the iceberg	2015	"Why the Titanic hit the iceberg". Analog Science Fiction and Fact. 135 (1&2): 91–99. January–February 2015.		

=== Non-fiction ===
- "Finder finders". Astronomer's Workbench. Sky & Telescope. 139 (6): 72–73. June 2020.
- "What the heck is an analemma?". Science. F&SF. 139 (1&2): 195–200. July–August 2020. Archived from the original on July 18, 2020.
