= Keith DeCandido =

American sci-fi and fantasy writer (born 1969)

Keith R. A. DeCandido
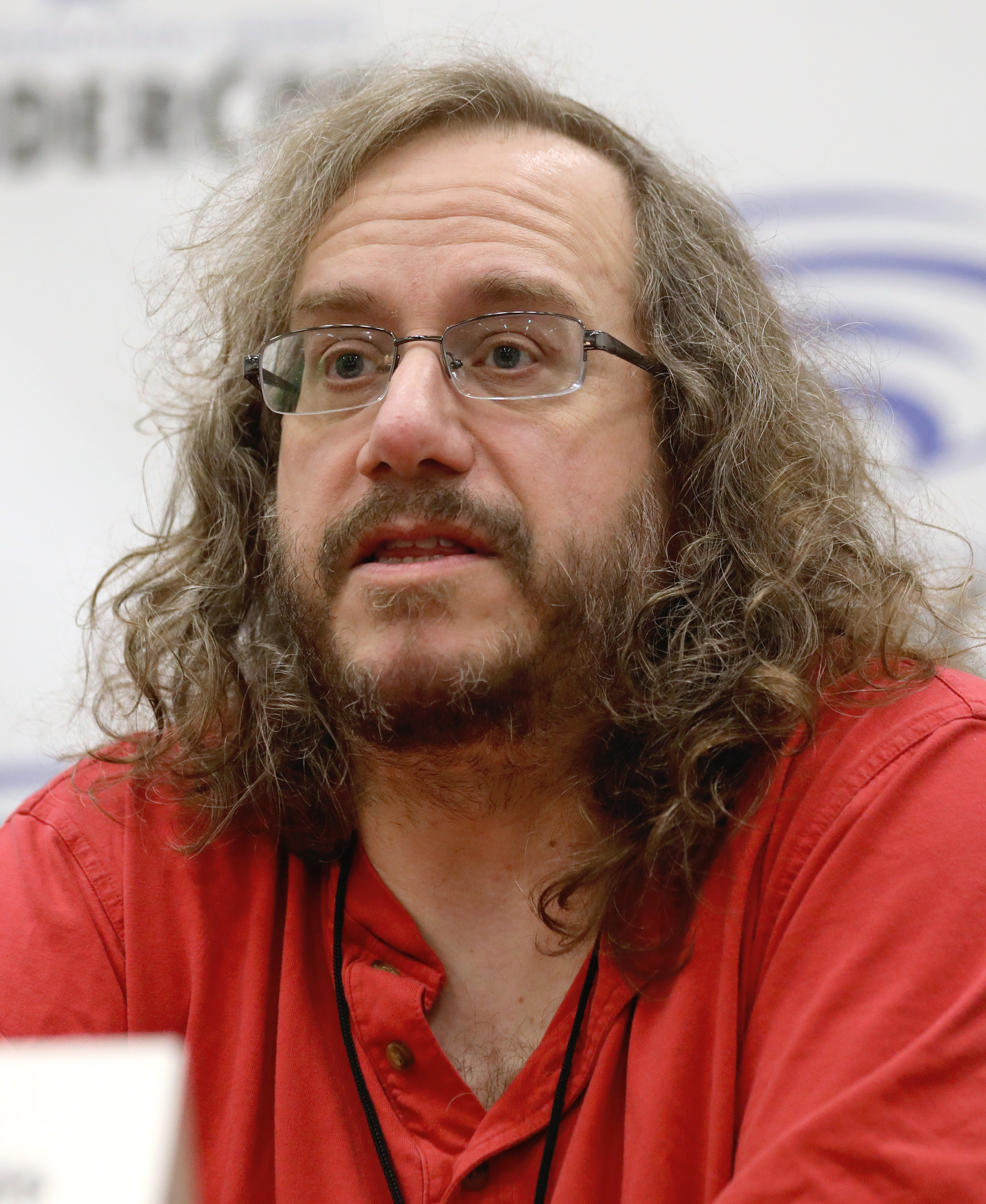
- DeCandido at the 2024 WonderCon
- Born: April 18, 1969 (age 57); New York City, U.S.
- Education: Fordham University
- Occupation: Writer
- Writing career
- Period: 1994–present
- Genres: Science fiction, fantasy
- Website: Official website

Keith Robert Andreassi DeCandido (born April 18, 1969) is an American science fiction and fantasy writer (using Keith R. A. DeCandido), martial artist, and musician, who works on comic books, novels, role-playing games and video games, including numerous media tie-in books for properties such as Star Trek, Buffy the Vampire Slayer, Doctor Who, Supernatural, Andromeda, Farscape, Leverage, Spider-Man, X-Men, Sleepy Hollow, and Stargate SG-1.

== Early life ==
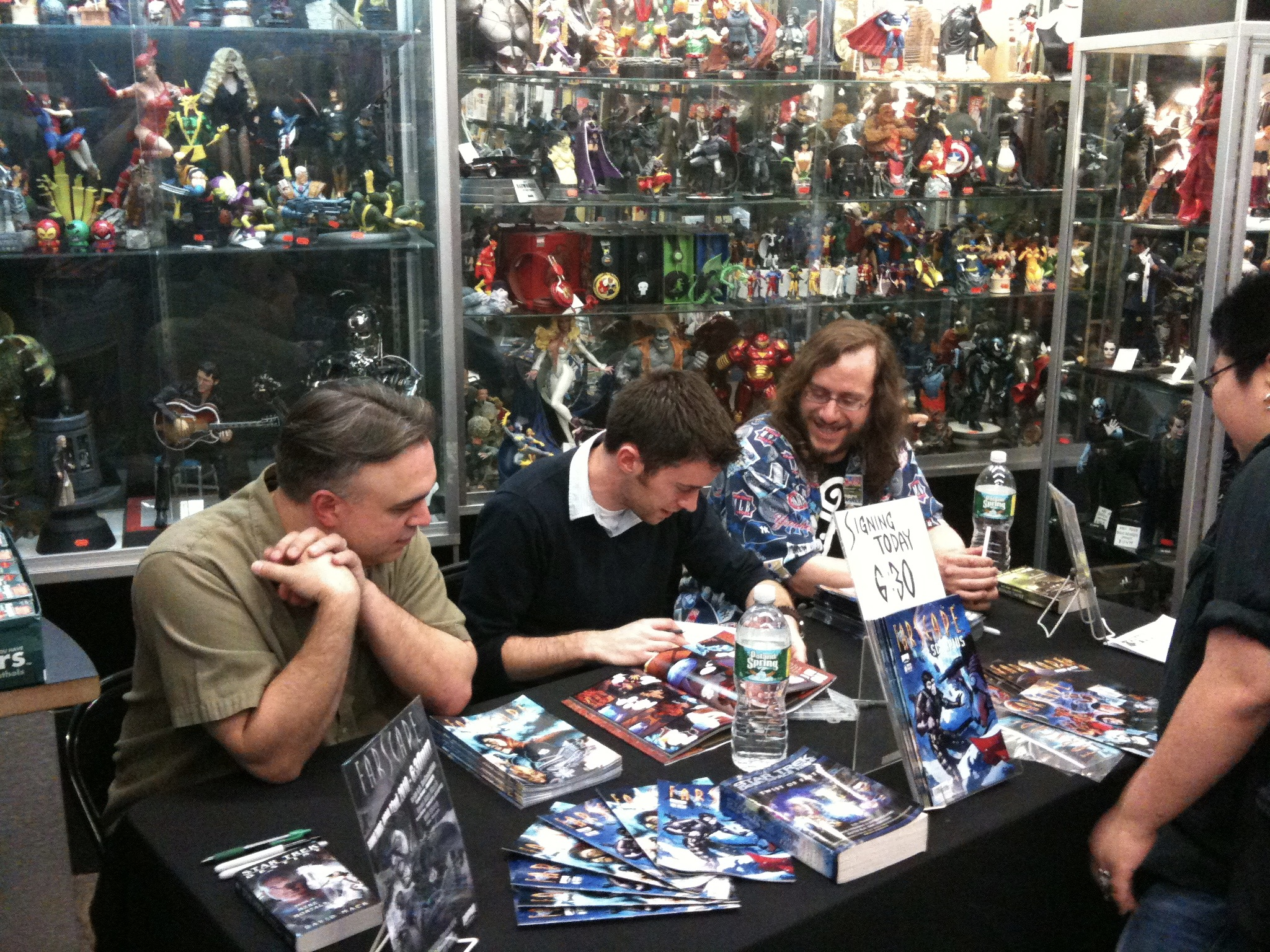
(From left to right:) David Alan Mack, Will Sliney and DeCandido at a signing at Forbidden Planet in Manhattan, April 22, 2010

DeCandido was born in the Bronx in New York City, the son of Robert L. DeCandido and GraceAnne Andreassi DeCandido. He claims to have been a Star Trek fan even before his birth, as his parents were fans of Star Trek: The Original Series.

DeCandido attended New Rochelle Academy and Halstead School, and then Cardinal Spellman High School in the Bronx before attending Fordham University. While attending Fordham University, DeCandido worked as an editor and writer of one of the college newspapers, called simply the paper.

== Career ==
After graduation, DeCandido worked as editor at several publishing companies, most notably for the various book packaging companies owned by Byron Preiss. Along with John S. Drew, in the 1990s he co-produced a public-access television cable TV show in Manhattan about science fiction called The Chronic Rift, which he also co-hosted. DeCandido and Drew and others revived the show as a podcast in 2008. DeCandido also used to host his own monthly podcast, Dead Kitchen Radio, on hiatus as of February 2019.

While DeCandido spent much of the early part of his writing career penning Star Trek fiction, he has written tie-ins for other popular sci-fi and fantasy series as well, such as Buffy the Vampire Slayer, Doctor Who, Supernatural, Stargate SG-1, Sleepy Hollow, Farscape, and Leverage as well as comic books (Spider-Man, X-Men), movies (Cars, Serenity, Alien), role-playing games (Dungeons & Dragons), and video games (World of Warcraft, StarCraft, Command & Conquer, Resident Evil). He has also written fiction in universes of his own creation: Dragon Precinct and its sequels, a high-fantasy police procedural; urban fantasy short stories set in Key West about a weirdness magnet named Cassie Zukav, who learns she is a Dís; the Adventures of Bram Gold, urban fantasy novels set in the Bronx; Super City Cops, novels, novellas, and short stories featuring cops in a city filled with superheroes; and Supernatural Crimes Unit: NYPD, an urban fantasy series that debuted in 2025 from the Weird Tales Presents imprint of Blackstone Publishing.

He has also edited or co-edited various anthologies, including OtherWere (with Laura Anne Gilman), Urban Nightmares (with Josepha Sherman), Imaginings, Double Trouble: An Anthology of Two-Fisted Team-Ups (with Jonathan Maberry), The Four ???? of the Apocalypse (with Wrenn Simms), the Doctor Who collection Short Trips: The Quality of Leadership, and the Star Trek anthologies New Frontier: No Limits (with Peter David), Tales of the Dominion War, and Tales from the Captain's Table. Among his other editorial accomplishments are editing the Marvel novels published by Berkley Books from 1994 to 2000 and the Star Trek: Starfleet Corps of Engineers series of monthly eBook novellas from 2000 to 2008. He continues to do freelance editorial work for personal clients.

In 2009, DeCandido was named Grandmaster by the International Association of Media Tie-In Writers. In 2026, he was awarded the Edward E. Smith Memorial Award for Imaginative Fiction, also known as the Skylark.

He has written rewatches for Reactor Magazine (formerly Tor.com) since 2011, including Star Trek: The Original Series, Star Trek: The Next Generation, Star Trek: Deep Space Nine, Star Trek: Voyager, Star Trek: Enterprise, Stargate, Batman 1966, "4-Color to 35-Millimeter: The Great Superhero Movie Rewatch," about every live-action superhero movie based on a comic book, and Babylon 5. DeCandido also writes reviews and commentary for Reactor, including reviews of many of TV adaptions of comic books and of the new Star Trek shows Star Trek: Discovery, Star Trek: Picard, Star Trek: Lower Decks, Star Trek: Strange New Worlds, Star Trek: Prodigy, Short Treks, Section 31, and Star Trek: Starfleet Academy.

== Personal life ==
DeCandido is an avid baseball fan, particularly of the New York Yankees. He has contributed in the past to both the Replacement Level Yankees Weblog and Pinstripe Alley, and he currently serves as an occasional freelance editor for the Society for American Baseball Research.

DeCandido is a percussionist. He was with the Don't Quit Your Day Job Players (a rock/blues band that played science fiction conventions, clubs, and fairs) from 1994 until the band broke up in 2000. He has played with David Honigsberg, Steven Rosenhaus, the Randy Bandits, and the Chris Abbott Band, and since 2006 has been a member of the Maryland-based parody band Boogie Knights, who are a fixture of several east coast science fiction conventions.

Since 2004, DeCandido has trained in Kenshikai Karate. He achieved his shodan (first-degree black belt) in 2009, and has been a yondan (fourth-degree black belt) since 2021.

== Bibliography ==
=== Star Trek novels ===
- The Next Generation - Diplomatic Implausibility (2001), ISBN 0-671-78554-0
- Deep Space Nine - Gateways: Demons of Air and Darkness (2001), ISBN 0-7434-1852-2
- The Brave and the Bold (2002), ISBN 0-7434-1922-7 (Book 1), ISBN 0-7434-1923-5 (Book 2)
- The Lost Era - The Art of the Impossible (2003), ISBN 0-7434-6405-2
- I.K.S. Gorkon - A Good Day to Die (2003), ISBN 0-7434-5714-5
- I.K.S. Gorkon - Honor Bound (2003), ISBN 0-7434-5716-1
- The Next Generation - A Time for War, A Time for Peace (2004), ISBN 0-7434-9179-3
- Ferenginar: Satisfaction Is Not Guaranteed in Worlds of Deep Space Nine Volume 3 (2005), ISBN 0-7434-8353-7
- I.K.S. Gorkon - Enemy Territory (2005), ISBN 1-4165-0014-6
- Articles of the Federation (2005), ISBN 1-4165-0015-4
- The Mirror-Scaled Serpent in Mirror Universe - Obsidian Alliances (2007), ISBN 0-7434-9253-6
- The Next Generation - Q&A (2007), ISBN 1-4165-2741-9 (nominee, Best Speculative Fiction Novel, Scribe Awards)
- Klingon Empire - A Burning House (2008), ISBN 1-4165-5647-8
- A Gutted World in Myriad Universes - Echoes and Refractions (2008), ISBN 1-4165-7181-7
- A Singular Destiny (2009), ISBN 1-4165-9495-7 (nominee, Best Speculative Fiction Novel, Scribe Awards)

=== Star Trek novellas, short stories, comic books, etc. ===
- The Next Generation - Perchance to Dream (four-issue comic book miniseries, art by Peter Pachoumis and Lucian Rizzo, with Scott Benefiel, February–May 2000) -- collected in Enemy Unseen (2001), ISBN 1-61377-131-2, alongside "The Killing Shadows" and "Embrace the Wolf"
- "Horn and Ivory" in Gateways: What Lay Beyond (2002), ISBN 0-7434-5683-1
- "Broken Oaths" in Deep Space Nine - Prophecy and Change (2003), ISBN 0-7434-7073-7
- "Revelations" in New Frontier - No Limits (2003), ISBN 0-7434-7707-3
- "The Ceremony of Innocence Is Drowned" in Tales of the Dominion War (2004), ISBN 0-7434-9171-8
- "loDnIpu' vavpu' je" ("Brothers and Fathers") in Tales from the Captain's Table (2005), ISBN 1-4165-0520-2
- "Letting Go" in Voyager - Distant Shores (2005), ISBN 0-7434-9253-6
- "Four Lights" in The Next Generation - The Sky's the Limit (2007), ISBN 0-7434-9255-2
- "Family Matters" in Mirror Universe - Shards and Shadows (2009), ISBN 1-4165-5850-0
- Alien Spotlight: Klingons: Four Thousand Throats... (comic book, art by JK Woodward, 2009; winner, Best Single Issue of a Comic Book, TrekMovie.com) -- collected in Alien Spotlight Volume 2 (2010), ISBN 1-60010-612-9, alongside Q, Romulans, Tribbles, and Cardassians.
- "The Unhappy Ones" in Seven Deadly Sins (2010)
- Captain's Log: Jellico (comic book, art by JK Woodward, 2010) -- collected in Captain's Log (2011), ISBN 1-60010-887-3, alongside Sulu, Pike, and Harriman.
- The Klingon Art of War (2014), ISBN 1-4767-5739-9
- several chapters of Star Trek Adventures: Klingon Empire Core Rulebook (2020)
- Star Trek Adventures: Incident at Kraav III (with Fred Love, 2022)
- "You Can't Buy Fate" in Star Trek Explorer #7 digital supplement (2023) -- collected in "The Mission" and Other Stories (2024)
- "The Kellidian Kidnapping" in Star Trek Explorer #8 (2023) -- collected in "A Year to the Day I Saw Myself Die" and Other Stories (2024)
- "Work Worth Doing" in Star Trek Explorer #9 (2023) -- collected in "A Year to the Day I Saw Myself Die" and Other Stories (2024)
- "Attempted Break-In" in Star Trek Explorer #11 digital supplement (2024)
- "The Sirius Snarl" in Star Trek Explorer #12 (2024)

=== Star Trek eBooks ===
- S.C.E. (Starfleet Corps of Engineers) series (2000–2006)
  - Fatal Error (2000)
  - Cold Fusion (2001)
  - Invincible Books 1-2 (w/David Mack, 2001)
  - Gateways epilogue: Here There Be Monsters (2001)
  - War Stories Books 1-2 (2002)
  - Breakdowns (2003)
  - Security (2005)
  - What's Past Book 6: Many Splendors (2006)
- The Next Generation - Slings and Arrows Book 6: Enterprises of Great Pitch and Moment (2008)

=== Precinct novels ===
- Dragon Precinct (2004), ISBN 978-1942990826, a high fantasy police procedural story and DeCandido's first original novel
- Unicorn Precinct (2011), ISBN 978-1942990840, sequel to Dragon Precinct
- Goblin Precinct (2012), ISBN 978-1942990864, sequel to Unicorn Precinct
- Gryphon Precinct (2013), ISBN 978-1942990888, sequel to Goblin Precinct
- Tales from Dragon Precinct (2013), ISBN 1942990901, short-story collection
- Mermaid Precinct (2019), ISBN 978-1-942990-92-5, sequel to Gryphon Precinct
- Phoenix Precinct (2022), ISBN 978-1956463170, sequel to Mermaid Precinct
- Dragon Precinct: Origins (forthcoming), second short-story collection
- Manticore Precinct (forthcoming), sequel to Phoenix Precinct
- More Tales from Dragon Precinct (forthcoming), third short-story collection

=== Precinct short stories ===
- "Getting the Chair" in Murder by Magic (2004; reprinted in Tales from Dragon Precinct, 2013), ISBN 0-446-67962-3
- "Crime of Passion" in Hear Them Roar (2006; reprinted in Tales from Dragon Precinct, 2013), ISBN 0-9773040-1-9
- "House Arrest" in Bad-Ass Faeries (2007; reprinted in Tales from Dragon Precinct, 2013 and The Best of Bad-Ass Faeries, 2017)
- "A Clean Getaway" in Pandora's Closet (2007; reprinted in Tales from Dragon Precinct, 2013)
- "Fire in the Hole" in Dragon's Lure (2010; reprinted in Tales from Dragon Precinct, 2013)
- "When the Magick Goes Away," Kickstarter-supported (2012; reprinted in Tales from Dragon Precinct, 2013)
- "Catch and Release" in Tales from Dragon Precinct (2013)
- "Brotherly Love" in Tales from Dragon Precinct (2013)
- "Blood in the Water" in Tales from Dragon Precinct (2013)
- "Heroes Welcome" in Tales from Dragon Precinct (2013)
- "Gan Brightblade vs. Mitos the Mighty," Kickstarter-supported (2014)
- "Baker's Dozen," Kickstarter-supported (2017)
- "Chaos Theory" in reissue of Gryphon Precinct (2018)
- "The Fall of Iaron," Kickstarter-supported (2019)
- "The Midwinter of Our Discontent" in Release the Virgins! (2019)
- "Used to Be" in Across the Universe: Tales of Alternative Beatles (2019)
- "The Gorvangin Rampages," Indiegogo-supported (2020)
- "Dispatches from Myverin: Torin ban Wyvald’s Story," in Dragon Precinct: Origins (2026)
- "The Shipment: Iaian’s Story," in Dragon Precinct: Origins (2026)
- "Ambush: Dru & Hawk’s Story," in Dragon Precinct: Origins (2026)
- "Bank Holiday: Amilar Grovis’s Story," in Dragon Precinct: Origins (2026)
- "Demon Swarm: Manfred & Arn Kellan’s Story," in Dragon Precinct: Origins (2026)
- "The Show Must Go On: Dannee Ocly’s Story," in Dragon Precinct: Origins (2026)
- "Assassin’s Creed: Aleta lothLathna’s Story," in Dragon Precinct: Origins (2026)
- "Disruptions: Danthres Tresyllione’s Story," in Dragon Precinct: Origins (2026)

=== Other novels ===
- Spider-Man: Venom's Wrath (written with Jose R. Nieto, 1998), ISBN 0-425-16574-4
- Young Hercules: Cheiron's Warriors (1999), ISBN 0-671-03552-5
- Young Hercules: The Ares Alliance (1999), ISBN 0-671-03554-1
- Farscape: House of Cards (2001), ISBN 0-8125-6162-7
- Andromeda: Destruction of Illusions (2003), ISBN 0-7653-4407-6
- Spider-Man: Down These Mean Streets (2005), ISBN 1-4165-0968-2 (reprinted in Spider-Man: The Darkest Hours Omnibus, 2021, ISBN 1789096049
- World of Warcraft: Cycle of Hatred (2006), ISBN 0-7434-7136-9
- Buffy the Vampire Slayer: Blackout (2006), ISBN 1-4169-1917-1
- StarCraft Ghost: Nova (2006), ISBN 0-7434-7134-2
- Buffy the Vampire Slayer: The Deathless (2007), ISBN 1-4169-3630-0 (nominee, Best YA Novel, Scribe Awards)
- Command & Conquer: Tiberium Wars (2007), ISBN 0-345-49814-3
- Supernatural: Nevermore (2007), ISBN 0-06-137090-8
- CSI: NY: Four Walls (2008), ISBN 1-4165-1343-4
- Supernatural: Bone Key (2008), ISBN 0-06-143503-1
- Mack Bolan, Executioner: Code of Honor (under Don Pendleton's name, 2009), ISBN 0-373-64373-X
- Supernatural: Heart of the Dragon (2010) ISBN 1-84856-600-X
- Mack Bolan, Executioner: Deep Recon (under Don Pendleton's name, 2010)
- Dungeons & Dragons: Under a Crimson Sun (2011), ISBN 978-0-7869-5797-2
- Super City Police Department: The Case of the Claw (2011)
- The Scattered Earth: Guilt in Innocence (2011)
- Leverage: The Zoo Job (2013), ISBN 978-0-425-25384-7 (nominee, Best General Original Novel, Scribe Awards)
- Sleepy Hollow: Children of the Revolution (2014), ISBN 978-0553419009 (nominee, Best Speculative Original Novel, Scribe Awards)
- Stargate SG-1: Kali's Wrath (2016), ISBN 978-1905586752
- Marvel's Thor: Dueling with Giants (2015), Book 1 of the Tales of Asgard trilogy, ISBN 978-1772751970
- Marvel's Sif: Even Dragons Have Their Endings (2016), Book 2 of the Tales of Asgard trilogy, ISBN 978-1772752298
- Marvel's Warriors Three: Godhood's End (2017), Book 3 of the Tales of Asgard trilogy, ISBN 978-1772752052
- A Furnace Sealed (2019), Book 1 of the Adventures of Bram Gold, ISBN 978-1956463415
- To Hell and Regroup (with David Sherman, 2020), ISBN 1942990464 Book 3 of Sherman's "18th Race" trilogy
- Animal (with Munish K. Batra, MD, FACS, 2021), ISBN 1680571613
- Feat of Clay (2024), Book 2 of the Adventures of Bram Gold, ISBN 978-1956463439
- Supernatural Crimes Unit: NYPD Book 1: The Thin Blue Ley-Line (2025), ISBN 979-8212913973
- The Inflictors Book 1: Come Together (forthcoming)

=== Novelizations ===
- Gargantua (1998), ISBN 0-8125-7098-7 (as K. Robert Andreassi)
- Buffy the Vampire Slayer: The Xander Years Volume 1 (1999), ISBN 0-671-02629-1
- Darkness Falls (2003), ISBN 0-7434-6632-2
- Resident Evil: Genesis (2004), ISBN 0-7434-9291-9
- Resident Evil: Apocalypse (2004), ISBN 0-7434-9349-4
- Serenity (2005), ISBN 1-4165-0755-8
- Resident Evil: Extinction (2007), ISBN 1-4165-4498-4
- Alien: Isolation, computer game novelization (2019), ISBN 1789093074

=== Novellas ===
- -30- (w/Steven Savile, 2012; reprinted in Without a License, 2015), part of the Viral series
- Heroes Reborn: Save the Cheerleader, Destroy the World (2015; reprinted in Heroes Reborn Collection Two, 2016)
- Super City Cops: Avenging Amethyst (2016)
- Super City Cops: Undercover Blues (2017)
- Super City Cops: Secret Identities (2017)
- Systema Paradoxa: All-the-Way House (2021)

=== Short story collections ===
- Ragnarok and Roll: Tales of Cassie Zukav, Weirdness Magnet (2013), ISBN 0-9860-0856-7
- Without a License: The Fantastic Worlds of Keith R.A. DeCandido (2015), ISBN 978-1-937051-76-1
- Ragnarok and a Hard Place: More Tales of Cassie Zukav, Weirdness Magnet (forthcoming)

=== Other comic books ===
- Farscape: The Beginning of the End of the Beginning (cowritten with Rockne S. O'Bannon, art by Tommy Patterson, four-issue miniseries, December 2008-April 2009)
- Farscape: Strange Detractors (cowritten with O'Bannon, art by Will Sliney, four-issue miniseries, April–July 2009)
- Farscape: D'Argo's Lament (art by Neil Edwards, four-issue miniseries, April–July 2009)
- Farscape: Gone and Back (cowritten with O'Bannon, art by Patterson, July–October 2009)
- Farscape: D'Argo's Trial (art by Caleb Cleveland, August–November 2009)
- Farscape (monthly series, cowritten with O'Bannon, art by Sliney, November 2009–October 2011)
- Farscape: D'Argo's Quest (art by Cleveland, December 2009-March 2010)
- StarCraft: Ghost Academy Volume 1 (manga, art by Fernando Furukawa, 2010)
- Cars: Adventures of Tow Mater #1-4 (art by Travis Hill, four-issue story arc, August–November 2010)
- Kung Fu Panda: Tales of the Dragon Warrior #1 (art by Massimo Asaro, backup story, 2013)
- Icarus (cowritten with Gregory A. Wilson, art by Áthila Fabbio, 2020)
- Resident Evil: Infinite Darkness—The Beginning (art by Carmelo Zagaria & Valentina Cuomo, five-issue miniseries, 2022–2024)
- Farscape 25th Anniversary Special (the story "The Hynerian Prisoner," art by Francesco Mortarino, 2024)
- Animal (five-issue miniseries, adaptation of the novel by DeCandido & Munish K. Batra, art by JK Woodward, forthcoming)

=== Short fiction ===
- "An Evening in the Bronx with Venom" in The Ultimate Spider-Man (1994), ISBN 1-57297-103-7, with John Gregory Betancourt
- "Improper Procedure" in The Ultimate Silver Surfer (1995), ISBN 1-57297-299-8
- "God Sins" in Magic: The Gathering: Distant Planes (1995), ISBN 0-06-105765-7
- "UNITed We Fall" in Doctor Who: Decalog 3: Consequences (1996), ISBN 0-426-20478-6
- "Arms and the Man" in Untold Tales of Spider-Man (1997), ISBN 1-57297-294-7
- "How You Can Prevent Forest Fires" in Urban Nightmares (1997; reprinted in Ragnarok and Roll: Tales of Cassie Zukav, Weirdness Magnet, 2013), ISBN 0-671-87851-4
- "A Bone to Pick" in Did You Say Chicks?! (1997), ISBN 0-671-87867-0, with Marina Frants
- "Playing It SAFE" in The Ultimate Hulk (1998), ISBN 0-425-16513-2
- "Diary of a False Man" in X-Men: Legends (2000), ISBN 0-425-17082-9
- "Raymond's Room" in Doctor Who: Missing Pieces (2001)
- "Recurring Character" in The Further Adventures of Xena: Warrior Princess (2001), ISBN 0-441-00852-6
- "A Vampire and a Vampire Hunter Walk Into a Bar" in Amazing Stories #608 (2005; reprinted in The Town Drunk, 2006; reprinted in Without a License, 2015)
- "Editorial Interference" in Circles in the Hair (2006; reprinted in Without a License, 2015)
- "Sunday in the Park with Spot" in Furry Fantastic (2006; reprinted in Without a License, 2015), ISBN 0-7564-0381-2
- "Life from Lifelessness" in Doctor Who: Short Trips: Destination Prague (2007)
- "Meiyo" on the Battlecorps.com web site (2008)
- "Three Sides to Every Story" in BattleTech: 25 Years of Art and Fiction (2009)
- "Letter from Guadalajara" in More Tales of Zorro (2011)
- "Under the King's Bridge" in Liar Liar: Short Stories from Members of the Liars Club (2011; reprinted in Without a License, 2015)
- "Ragnarok and Roll" in Tales from the House Band Volume 1 (2011; reprinted in Apocalypse 13, 2012, and in Ragnarok and Roll: Tales of Cassie Zukav, Weirdness Magnet, 2013)
- "The Ballad of Big Charlie" in V-Wars (2012; reprinted in Without a License, 2015)
- "I Believe I'm Sinkin' Down" in Tales from the House Band Volume 2 (2012; reprinted in Ragnarok and Roll: Tales of Cassie Zukav, Weirdness Magnet, 2013)
- "The Stone of the First High Pontiff" in Defending the Future: Best-Laid Plans (2013; reprinted in Without a License, 2015)
- "Undine the Boardwalk" in Ragnarok and Roll: Tales of Cassie Zukav, Weirdness Magnet (2013; reprinted in Bad-Ass Faeries: It's Elemental, 2014)
- "Love Over and Over" in Ragnarok and Roll: Tales of Cassie Zukav, Weirdness Magnet (2013)
- "Cayo Hueso Part 1: A Farewell to Cats" in Ragnarok and Roll: Tales of Cassie Zukav, Weirdness Magnet (2013)
- "Cayo Hueso Part 2: The Buck Stops Here" in Ragnarok and Roll: Tales of Cassie Zukav, Weirdness Magnet (2013)
- "Cayo Hueso Part 3: Twisting Fate" in Ragnarok and Roll: Tales of Cassie Zukav, Weirdness Magnet (2013)
- "God of Blunder" in Ragnarok and Roll: Tales of Cassie Zukav, Weirdness Magnet (2013)
- "Stone Cold Whodunit" in With Great Power (2014)
- "Fish Out of Water" in Out of Tune (2014), a tale of Cassie Zukav, weirdness magnet
- "Time Keeps on Slippin'" in Stargate SG-1/Stargate Atlantis: Far Horizons (2014)
- "Down to the Waterline" in Buzzy Mag Online (2015) , a tale of Cassie Zukav, weirdness magnet
- "Partners in Crime" in Without a License: The Fantastic Worlds of Keith R.A. DeCandido (2015), set in the same universe as Dragon Precinct
- "Seven-Mile Race" in Without a License: The Fantastic Worlds of Keith R.A. DeCandido (2015), a tale of Cassie Zukav, weirdness magnet
- "Wild Bill Got Shot" in Without a License: The Fantastic Worlds of Keith R.A. DeCandido (2015)
- "Behold a White Tricycle" in Without a License: The Fantastic Worlds of Keith R.A. DeCandido (2015)
- "Back in El Paso My Life Will Be Worthless" in The X-Files: Trust No One (2015)
- "William Did It" on StoryOfTheMonthClub.com (2015; reprinted in A Baker's Dozen of Magic, 2016), a tale of Cassie Zukav, weirdness magnet
- "Send in the Clones" in The Side of Good/The Side of Evil (2015)
- "Streets of Fire" in V-Wars: Night Terrors (2016)
- "We Seceded Where Others Failed" in Altered States of the Union (2016)
- "Right on, Sister!" in Limbus Inc. Book 3 (2016)
- "Identity" in Baker Street Irregulars (2017)
- "Deep Background" in Aliens: Bug Hunt (2017)
- "Behind the Wheel" in TV Gods: Summer Programming (2017), a tale of Cassie Zukav, weirdness magnet
- "Live and On the Scene" in Nights of the Living Dead (2017)
- "Ganbatte" in Joe Ledger: Unstoppable (2017; winner, Best Short Story, Scribe Awards)
- "Sun-Breaker" in Stargate SG-1/Atlantis: Homeworlds (2017)
- "Six Red Dragons" in Baker Street Irregulars, Volume 2 (2018)
- "House Hunting" in They Keep Killing Glenn (2018)
- "Rán for Your Life" in Unearthed (2019), a tale of Cassie Zukav, Weirdness Magnet
- "Alien Invasion of Earth!" in Thrilling Adventure Yarns (2019)
- "The Silent Dust" in Brave New Girls: Adventures of Gals & Gizmos (2019)
- "The Puzzle" in Footprints in the Stars (2019)
- "Materfamilias" in Bad Ass Moms (2020)
- "Journalistic Integrity" in Pangaea III: Redemption (2020)
- "Unguarded" in Devilish and Divine (2021)
- "Ragnarok and a Hard Place," Indiegogo-supported (2021)
- "In Earth and Sky and Sea Strange Things There Be" in Turning the Tied (2021)
- "The Carpet’s Tale" in The Fans are Buried Tales (2022)
- "What You Can Become Tomorrow" in Three Time Travelers Walk Into… (2022)
- "History Lesson for Royal Puppies in the Castle Portrait Gallery” in Ludlow Charlington’s Doghouse (2022)
- "The Light Shines in the Darkness" in Phenomenons: Every Human Creature (2022)
- "Smells Like Teen Spirit" in Tales of Capes and Cowls (2022)
- "A Lovely View" in Zorro’s Exploits (2022)
- "The Rat’s Tail" in The Eye of Argon and the Further Adventures of Grignr (2022)
- "Ticonderoga Beck and the Stalwart Squad" in Thrilling Adventure Yarns 2022 (2022)
- "This Little Light of Mine" in Phenomenons: Season of Darkness (2023)
- "Know Thyself Deathless" in Double Trouble: An Anthology of Two-Fisted Team-Ups (2023)
- "The Thick Blue Line" in Sherlock Holmes: Cases by Candlelight Volume 2 (2023)
- "Prezzo" in Weird Tales: 100 Years of Weird (2023)
- "What Do You Want From Me, I'm Old" in The Four ???? of the Apocalypse (2023)
- "Another Dead Body on the Corner" in Joe Ledger: Unbreakable (2023)
- "The Legend of Long-Ears" in The Good, the Bad, and the Uncanny: Tales of a Very Weird West (2023)
- "Progenitor" in A Cry of Hounds (2024)
- "Stop Dragon My Heart Around" in A Trove of Legacies (2024)
- "House Party" in A Furnace Sealed limited-edition hardcover (2024)
- "Wake Me Up Before You Wendigo" in Feat of Clay limited-edition hardcover (2024)
- "Blinded by the Light" in Phenomenons: The Wind and Fire (2024)
- "Death Row" in Sherlock Holmes: Cases by Candlelight Volume 3 (2024)
- "The Norwood Contractor" in Multiverse of Mystery (2024)
- "A Scandal on 47th Street" in Sherlock Holmes: Eliminate the Impossible (2025)
- "The Immoral Immortal" in An Assembly of Monsters (2025)
- "When Winzy Met Verny: The Mortal Immortal Encounters the Last Man" in An Assembly of Monsters limited-edition hardcover (2025)
- "Movin' On Up" in PRISM: The Mission Files (2025)
- "Order Up" in Weird Tales #371 (August 2025)
- "Everybody Was Kung-Fu Fighting" in The Green Hornet & Kato: Detroit Noir City (forthcoming)
- "The Exact Nature of Our Wrongs" in Weird Tales #372 (forthcoming)
- "Road to Nowhere" in Jukebox Thrillers: Solid Hits of the 80s! (forthcoming)
- "The Steam Man" in Weird Tales #373 (forthcoming)
- "Say What You Mean and Mean What You Say," in A Curiosity of Cats (forthcoming)
- "Instant Karma," in Creepshow: 13 Tales of Terror (forthcoming)
- "A Pile of Rocks with No Marker," in Wicked Westerns (forthcoming)
- "The Abduction of Ticonderoga Beck!" in Thrilling Adventure Yarns 2026 (forthcoming)

=== Reference books ===
- John Winchester Hardcover Ruled Journal (2017)
- Orphan Black: Classified Clone Report (2017)
- Poison Ivy Hardcover Ruled Journal (2018)
- Batman: Quotes from Gotham City (2019)
