= Dean Wesley Smith =

American novelist

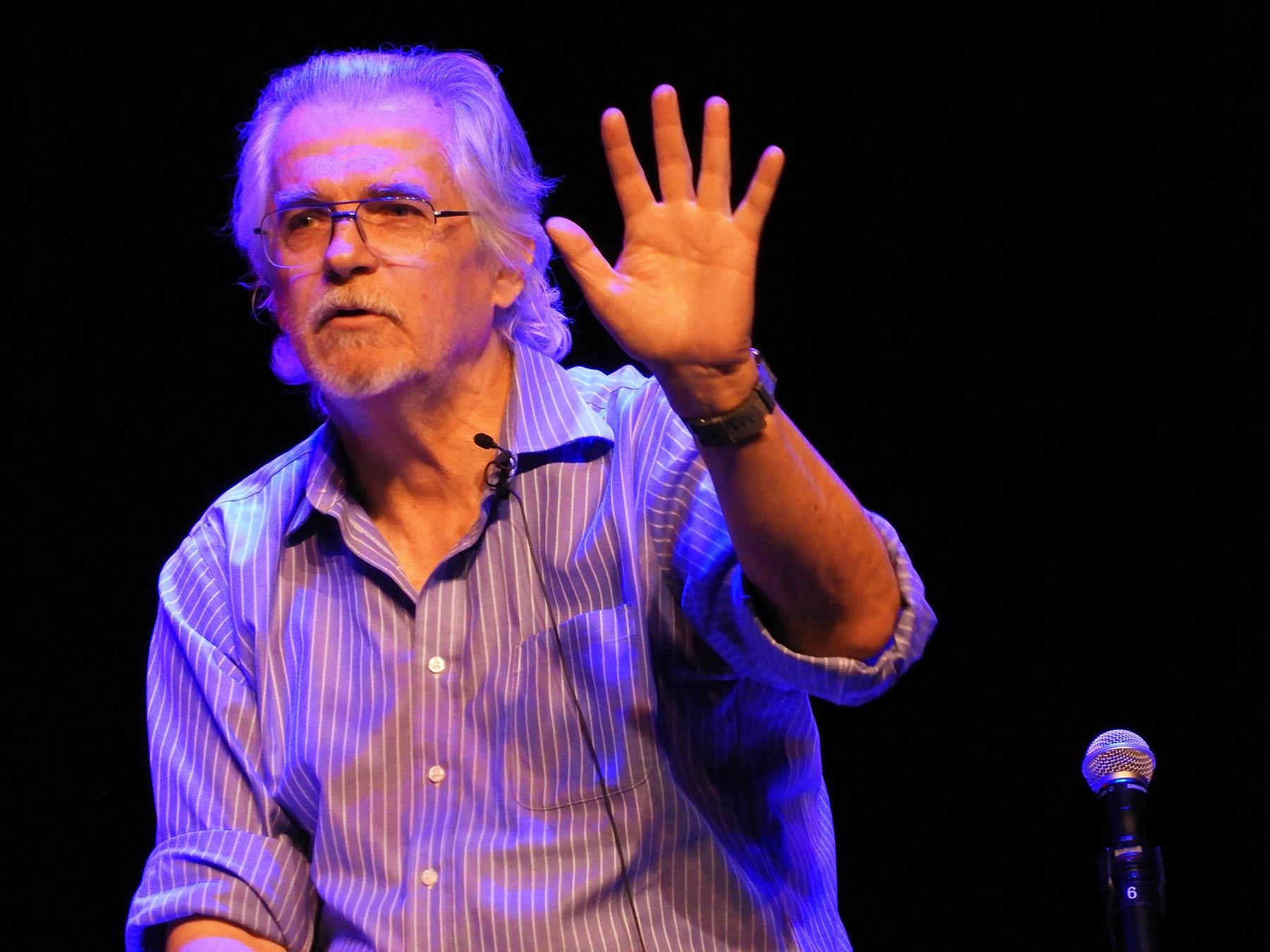
- Smith in 2018
- Born: November 10, 1950 (age 75)
- Occupation: Writer
- Spouse: Kristine Kathryn Rusch
- Writing career
- Genres: Science fiction, mystery, fantasy

Dean Wesley Smith (born November 10, 1950) is an American writer of science fiction, mystery, and fantasy. Smith has published nearly 200 novels and hundreds of short stories.

Smith has also written novels for various media franchises including Star Trek, Spider-Man, X-Men, Men in Black, and many other gaming, television, and movie properties.

Smith's novel Laying the Music to Rest was nominated for the 1990 Bram Stoker Award for Best First Novel. His short story In the Shade of the Slowboat Man was nominated for the 1997 Nebula Award for Best Short Story.

He is married to fellow writer and editor Kristine Kathryn Rusch and they have collaborated on several works. Smith and Rusch operated Pulphouse Publishing for many years and edited the original (hardback) incarnation of Pulphouse Magazine; they won a World Fantasy Award in 1989.

Smith attributes his prolific output to a self-developed writing method he calls "cycling", where he does minor edits and revisions as he goes along with a manuscript. The goal is to finish a sellable novel within a few weeks or a month, without needing a substantial second draft, due to his belief that over-writing or endlessly editing a novel tends to diminish its quality.

== Bibliography ==
=== Shadow Warrior ===
- For Dead Eyes Only, Pocket, October 1997

=== The Tenth Planet ===
with Kristine Kathryn Rusch

- The Tenth Planet, Del Rey, 1999
- Oblivion, Del Rey, 2000
- The Final Assault, Del Rey, 2000

=== Pilgrim Hugh Incident ===
- The Case of the Intrusive Furniture, WMG Publishing, 2011
- Miss Smallwood's Goodies, WMG Publishing, 2011
- The Case of the Dead Lady Blues, WMG Publishing, 2016
- The Case of the Lost Treasure, WMG Publishing, 2016
- The Case of the Simple Passage, WMG Publishing, 2016

=== Doc Thriller ===
- Dead Money, WMG Publishing, 2013

=== Marble Grant ===
- Whistle for Help: A Marble Grant Story, WMG Publishing, 9 May 2021
- The First Year: A Marble Grant Novel, WMG Publishing, 20 July 2021

=== Cold Poker Gang ===
- Kill Game, WMG Publishing, May, 2014
- Cold Call, WMG Publishing, February, 2015
- Calling Dead, WMG Publishing, May, 2015
- Bad Beat, WMG Publishing, January, 2016
- Dead Hand, WMG Publishing, June, 2016
- Freezeout, WMG Publishing, October, 2016
- Ace High, WMG Publishing, February, 2017
- Burn Card, WMG Publishing, December, 2017
- Heads Up, WMG Publishing, November, 2019
- Ring Game, WMG Publishing, April 2020
- Bottom Pair, WMG Publishing, June 2021
- The Remarkable Way She Died, WMG Publishing, March 2021
- Under Glass, WMG Publishing, March 2021

=== Thunder Mountain ===
- Thunder Mountain, WMG Publishing, January, 2014
- Monumental Summit, WMG Publishing, March, 2014
- Avalanche Creek, WMG Publishing, November, 2014
- The Edwards Mansion, WMG Publishing, January, 2015
- Lake Roosevelt, WMG Publishing, March, 2015
- Warm Springs, WMG Publishing, April, 2015
- Melody Ridge, WMG Publishing, December, 2015
- Grapevine Springs, WMG Publishing, April, 2016
- The Idanha Hotel, WMG Publishing, July, 2016
- The Taft Ranch, WMG Publishing, September, 2016
- Tombstone Canyon, WMG Publishing, December, 2017
- Dry Creek Crossing, WMG Publishing, December, 2017

=== Non-fiction ===
- Writing a Novel in Seven Days
- Heinlein's Rules
- How to Write Fiction Sales Copy
- Stages of a Fiction Writer
- Writing into the Dark
- Killing the Top Ten Sacred Cows of Publishing
- Killing the Top Ten Sacred Cows of Indie Publishing
- How to Write a Novel in Ten Days
- Think Like a Publisher
- The First Tee Panic

=== Smith's Monthly ===
- Smith's Monthly #1, WMG Publishing, October, 2013
- Smith's Monthly #2, WMG Publishing, November, 2013
- Smith's Monthly #3, WMG Publishing, December, 2013
- Smith's Monthly #4, WMG Publishing, January, 2014
- Smith's Monthly #5, WMG Publishing, February, 2014
- Smith's Monthly #6, WMG Publishing, March, 2014
- Smith's Monthly #7, WMG Publishing, April, 2014
- Smith's Monthly #8, WMG Publishing, May, 2014
- Smith's Monthly #9, WMG Publishing, June, 2014
- Smith's Monthly #10, WMG Publishing, July, 2014
- Smith's Monthly #11, WMG Publishing, August, 2014
- Smith's Monthly #12, WMG Publishing, September, 2014
- Smith's Monthly #13, WMG Publishing, October, 2014
- Smith's Monthly #14, WMG Publishing, November, 2014
- Smith's Monthly #15, WMG Publishing, December, 2014
- Smith's Monthly #16, WMG Publishing, January, 2015
- Smith's Monthly #17, WMG Publishing, February, 2015
- Smith's Monthly #18, WMG Publishing, March, 2015
- Smith's Monthly #19, WMG Publishing, April, 2015
- Smith's Monthly #20, WMG Publishing, May, 2015
- Smith's Monthly #21, WMG Publishing, June, 2015
- Smith's Monthly #22, WMG Publishing, July, 2015
- Smith's Monthly #23, WMG Publishing, August, 2015
- Smith's Monthly #24, WMG Publishing, September, 2015
- Smith's Monthly #25, WMG Publishing, October, 2015
- Smith's Monthly #26, WMG Publishing, November, 2015
- Smith's Monthly #27, WMG Publishing, December, 2015
- Smith's Monthly #28, WMG Publishing, January, 2016
- Smith's Monthly #29, WMG Publishing, February, 2016
- Smith's Monthly #30, WMG Publishing, March, 2016
- Smith's Monthly #31, WMG Publishing, April, 2016
- Smith's Monthly #32, WMG Publishing, May, 2016
- Smith's Monthly #33, WMG Publishing, June, 2016
- Smith's Monthly #34, WMG Publishing, July, 2016
- Smith's Monthly #35, WMG Publishing, August, 2016
- Smith's Monthly #36, WMG Publishing, September, 2016
- Smith's Monthly #37, WMG Publishing, October, 2016
- Smith's Monthly #38, WMG Publishing, November, 2016
- Smith's Monthly #39, WMG Publishing, December. 2016
- Smith's Monthly #40, WMG Publishing, January, 2017
- Smith's Monthly #41, WMG Publishing, February, 2017
- Smith's Monthly #42, WMG Publishing, March, 2017
- Smith's Monthly #43, WMG Publishing, April, 2017
- Smith's Monthly #44, WMG Publishing, May, 2017
- Smith's Monthly #45, WMG Publishing, January, 2021
- Smith's Monthly #46, WMG Publishing, February, 2021
- Smith's Monthly #47, WMG Publishing, March, 2021
- Smith's Monthly #48, WMG Publishing, April, 2021
- Smith's Monthly #49, WMG Publishing, May, 2021
- Smith's Monthly #50, WMG Publishing, June, 2021
- Smith's Monthly #51, WMG Publishing, July, 2021
- Smith's Monthly #52, WMG Publishing, August, 2021
- Smith's Monthly #53, WMG Publishing, September, 2021
- Smith's Monthly #54, WMG Publishing, October, 2021

=== Seeder's Universe ===
- Shadow in the City, WMG Publishing, September, 2010
- Dust and Kisses, WMG Publishing, January, 2014
- Against Time, WMG Publishing, February, 2014
- Sector Justice, WMG Publishing, April, 2014
- Morning Song, WMG Publishing, August, 2014
- The High Edge, WMG Publishing, October, 2014
- Star Mist, WMG Publishing, February, 2016
- Star Rain,WMG Publishing, March, 2016
- Star Fall,WMG Publishing, November, 2016
- A Bad Patch of Humanity, WMG Publishing, March, 2016
- Dreaming Large, WMG Publishing, March, 2016
- A Matter for a Future Year, WMG Publishing, March, 2016
- Starburst, WMG Publishing, January, 2017
- A Billion Earths, WMG Publishing, March, 2021

=== Poker Boy ===
- The Slot's of Saturn, WMG Publishing, 2014
- The Old Girlfriend of Doom, WMG Publishing, 2010
- Dead Even, WMG Publishing, 2010
- Gods Aren't Funny, WMG Publishing, 2016
- Gambling Hell, WMG Publishing, 2013
- Luck Be a Lady, WMG Publishing, 2010
- Sighed the Snake, WMG Publishing, 2012
- The Smoke That Doesn't Bark, WMG Publishing, 2012
- The War of Poker, WMG Publishing, 2013
- Daddy is an Undertaker, WMG Publishing, 2012
- Nonexistent No MOre, WMG Publishing, 2013
- Fighting the Fuzzy-Wuzzy, WMG Publishing, 2012
- Pink Shoes and Hot Chocolate, WMG Publishing, 2012
- Shootout in the Okey-Doke Casino, WMG Publishing, 2012
- Dried Up, WMG Publishing, 2012
- The Empty Mummy Murders, WMG Publishing, 2012
- Living Time, WMG Publishing, 2013
- Not Saleable For Sale, WMG Publishing, 2013
- Just Shoot Me Now, WMG Publishing, 2013
- For the Balance of a Heart, WMG Publishing, 2012
- A Night With a Forgotten God, WMG Publishing, 2016
- They're Back, WMG Publishing, 2016
- Gods Have History, WMG Publishing, 2016
- Leaking Away a Life, WMG Publishing, 2016
- The Rude Improbable Presumptive, WMG Publishing, 2016
- The Women of the Felt, WMG Publishing, 2011
- Poker Boy vs The Silicon Suckers, WMG Publishing, 2012
- Luck Be Ladies, WMG Publishing, 2019
- Playing a Hunch, WMG Publishing, 2020
- Mystery Cat, WMG Publishing, 2021
- The Portal of Wrong Love, WMG Publishing, 2021

The Tenth Planet series, on which he collaborated with his wife, author Kristine Kathryn Rusch.

Smith's film novelizations include Final Fantasy: The Spirits Within, The Rundown, Steel, The Core, and X-Men. an Other properties include Aliens, Roswell, Smallville, and Quantum Leap.

His Star Trek novels include original books in series adapted from five of the live action television series: the original series, The Next Generation, Deep Space Nine, Voyager and Enterprise. He has also written books in the Star Trek: Starfleet Corps of Engineers series, and has edited the contest anthology series, Star Trek: Strange New Worlds.

Smith's stories can also be found in almost 20 different anthologies, such as Journeys to the Twilight Zone (1992), The Book of Kings (1995), and Past Lives, Present Tense. He also wrote 4 books with his wife under the name Sandy Schofield.

In 1992, Smith was the founding publisher of Tomorrow Speculative Fiction before selling the magazine to editor Algis Budrys's UniFont.

=== Collections ===
- A Poker Boy Christmas: A Poker Boy Collection, WMG Publishing, 9 November 2021.
- The End Might Be Interesting After All: Six Really, Really Whacked Out End-of-Things Stories, WMG Publishing, 9 November 2021.
- Too Strange for the Name: Six Really, Really, Really Whacked Out Stories with Sex, WMG Publishing, 9 November 2021
- A Case for Aliens: Six Really, Really, Really Whacked Out Alien Stories, WMG Publishing, 26 October 2021
- Fantasy Love: Six Really, Really, Really Whacked Out Love Stories, WMG Publishing, 26 October 2021
- Weird Crime: Six Really, Really, Really Whacked Out Crime Stories, WMG Publishing, 26 October 2021
- Time for Cool Madness: Six Really, Really, Really Strange Marble Grant Stories, WMG Publishing, 26 October 2021
- Holiday Insanity: Six Really, Really, Really, Whacked Out Holiday Stories, WMG Publishing, 26 October 2021
- A Billion Earths: A Seeders Universe Collection, WMG Publishing, 21 March 2021
- Luck Be Ladies: A Poker Boy Collection, WMG Publishing, 17 August 2019
- Alien Vibrations: Five Strange Science Fiction Short Stories, WMG Publishing, 29 December 2017
- The Case of Pilgrim Hugh: Five STrange Detective Stories, WMG Publishing, 18 April 2017

=== Short stories ===
- Black Betsy • [Jukebox] (1994) (collected in Mike Resnick's alternate history anthology Alternate Outlaws)

== Awards ==
- Smith's novel Laying the Music to Rest, was nominated for the 1990 Bram Stoker Award for Best First Novel.
- Smith's short story, In the Shade of the Slowboat Man, was nominated for the 1997 Nebula Award for Best Short Story.
