= Scribe Awards =

Annual entertainment award

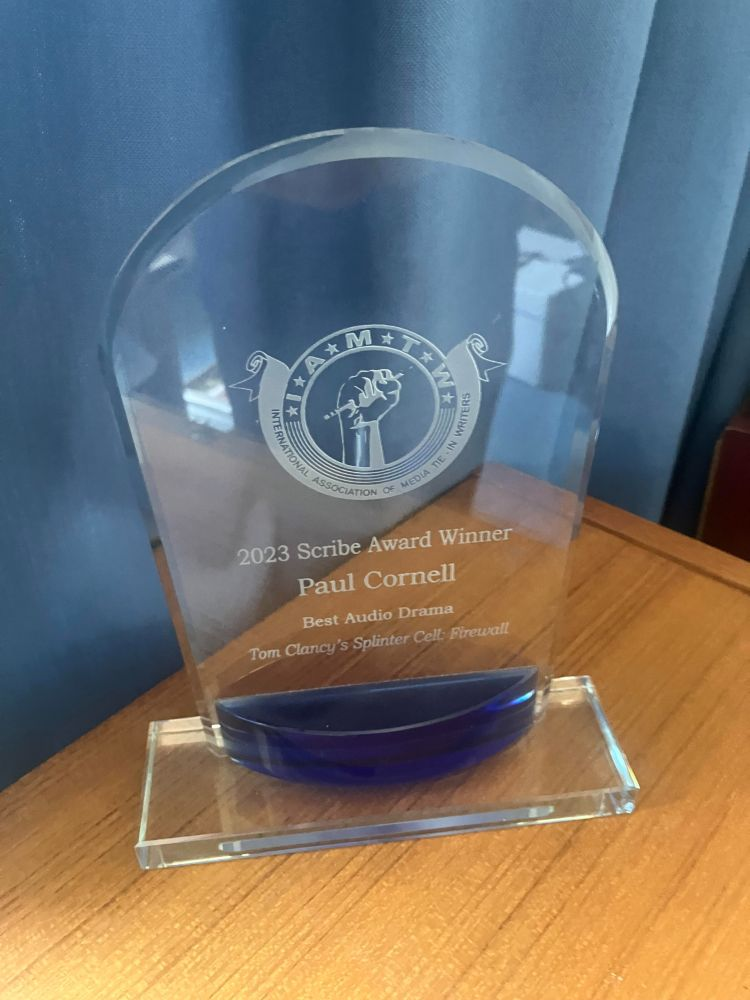
Scribe Award belonging to Paul Cornell

The Scribe Awards, established in 2007 by The International Association of Media Tie-In Writers (IAMTW), "acknowledge and celebrate excellence in licensed tie-in works based on TV shows, movies, and games (video games, computer games, rpgs)". Where most literary awards are based on the calendar year, the Scribe Awards, since 2020, have an eligibility period based of March to February the following year.

Awards are given in the following categories:

- Adapted Novel – General or Speculative
- Audio Drama
- Graphic Novel
- Original Novel – General
- Original Novel – Speculative
- Young Adult – Adapted or Original
- Short Story

There is also a Grandmaster position, awarded annually to a writer who has contributed to tie-in writing. This is sometimes referred to as the Faust Award.

The awards are juried, with the juries being made up of other members of the IAMTW. A different jury is in place for each category. The juries are not published.

== Winners and Nominees ==
=== Adapted Novel ===
Best Adapted Novel
Year	Category	Author	Nominated Work	Franchise	Result	Ref
2007	Speculative	Marv Wolfman	Superman Returns	DC Comics	Won	
2007	Speculative	Steven Savile	Slaine: The Exile	2000 AD	Nominated	
2007	Speculative	Lloyd Kaufman & Adam Jahnke	Toxic Avenger: The Novel		Nominated	
2007	Speculative	Yvonne Navarro	Ultraviolet		Nominated	
2007	Speculative	Greg Cox	Underworld: Evolution	Underworld	Nominated	
2007	General	Christa Faust	Snakes on a Plane		Won	
2007	General	Max Allan Collins	The Pink Panther		Nominated	
2008	General	Max Allan Collins	American Gangster		Won	
2008	Speculative	Tim Lebbon	30 Days Of Night		Won	
2008	Speculative	Keith R.A. Decandido	Resident Evil: Extinction		Nominated	
2008	Speculative	Greg Cox	52: The Novel	DC Comics	Nominated	
2008	Young Adult	Steven Paul Leiva	The 12 Dogs Of Christmas		Won	
2009	General	James Rollins	Indiana Jones and the Kingdom of the Crystal Skull	Indiana Jones	Won	
2009	General	Greg Cox	Death Defying Acts		Nominated	
2009	General	Elizabeth Massie	King Takes Queen	The Tudors	Nominated	
2009	General	Dale C. Phillips	The Wackness		Nominated	
2009	General	Max Allan Collins	The X Files: I Want to Believe	The X Files	Nominated	
2009	Speculative	Bob Greenberger	Hellboy II: The Golden Army	Hellboy	Won	
2009	Speculative	Matt Forbeck	The Mutant Chronicles		Nominated	
2009	Speculative	Karen Miller	Star Wars—The Clone Wars: Wild Space	Star Wars	Nominated	
2009	Speculative	Greg Cox	Underworld: Rise Of The Lycans	Underworld	Nominated	
2009	Young Adult	Tracey West	Journey To The Center Of The Earth 3D		Won	
2009	Young Adult	Stephen D. Sullivan	Iron Man: The Junior Novel	Marvel Comics	Nominated	
2009	Young Adult	Stacia Deutsch And Rhody Cohon	The Dark Knight: The Junior Novel	DC Comics	Nominated	
2010	N/A	Elizabeth Massie	Thy Will Be Done	The Tudors	Won	
2010	N/A	Greg Cox	Countdown		Nominated	
2010	N/A	Max Allan Collins	GI Joe: Rise Of The Cobra	G.I. Joe	Nominated	
2011	N/A	Jonathan Maberry	The Wolfman		Won	
2011	N/A	Greg Cox	Final Crisis	DC Comics	Nominated	
2011	N/A	Matthew Stover & Robert E. Vardeman	God Of War		Nominated	
2012	N/A	Joan D. Vinge	Cowboys & Aliens		Won	
2012	N/A	Michael Stackpole	Conan The Barbarian		Nominated	
2012	N/A	Peter Watts	Crysis Legion		Nominated	
2012	N/A	Peter David	Dark Side Of The Moon	Transformers	Nominated	
2013	N/A	Kevin J. Anderson	Clockwork Angels	Rush	Won	
2013	N/A	Stacia Deutsch	Batman The Dark Knight Legend	DC Comics	Nominated	
2013	N/A	Greg Cox	Batman The Dark Knight Rises	DC Comics	Nominated	
2013	N/A	Tracey West	Astroknights Island	Poptropica	Nominated	
2014	N/A	Alex Irvine	Pacific Rim		Won	
2014	N/A	Greg Cox	Man of Steel		Nominated	
2014	N/A	Joan D. Vinge	47 Ronin		Nominated	
2015	N/A	Alex Irvine	Dawn of the Planet of the Apes	Planet of the Apes	Won	
2015	N/A	Mark Morris	Noah		Nominated	
2015	N/A	Adam Whitlach	War of the Worlds Goliath		Nominated	
2016	N/A	Stephen D. Sullivan	Manos: The Hands of Fate		Won	
2016	N/A	D. E. McDonald	Backcountry		Nominated	
2016	N/A	Marv Wolfman	Batman: Arkham Knight	DC Comics	Nominated	
2016	N/A	Nancy Holder	Crimson Peak		Nominated	
2016	N/A	Christie Golden	Star Wars: Dark Disciple	Star Wars	Nominated	
2017	N/A	Christie Golden	Assassin's Creed		Won	
2017	N/A	Max Allan Collins	Road to Perdition		Nominated	
2017	N/A	Marv Wolfman	Suicide Squad		Nominated	
2018	N/A	James Goss	The Pirate Planet	Doctor Who	Won	
2018	N/A	Tim Waggoner	The Final Chapter	Resident Evil	Nominated	
2018	N/A	Christie Golden	Valerian and the City of a Thousand Planets		Nominated	
2018	N/A	Tim Lebbon	Kong Skull Island		Nominated	
2019	N/A	Guillermo del Toro and Daniel Kraus	The Shape of Water		Won	
2019	N/A	John Passarella	Halloween		Nominated	
2019	N/A	Christopher Golden and Mark Morris	The Predator		Nominated	
2019	N/A	Mur Lafferty	Solo: A Star Wars Story		Nominated	
2020	N/A	Pat Cadigan	Alita: Battle Angel		Won	
2020	N/A	Christa Faust and Gary Phillips	Batman: The Killing Joke	DC Comics	Nominated	
2020	N/A	Tom Baker and James Goss	Scratch Man	Doctor Who	Nominated	
2020	N/A	Greg Keyes	Godzilla: King of the Monsters		Nominated	
2021	Adapted and Original	James Swallow & Josh Reynolds	Day Zero	Watch Dogs Legion	Won	
2021	Adapted and Original	Max Allan Collins	Masquerade for Murder		Nominated	
2021	Adapted and Original	Rae Carson	The Rise of Skywalker	Star Wars	Nominated	
2021	Adapted and Original	David J. Howe	Mindgame		Nominated	
2022	N/A	Pat Cadigan	Alien 3		Won	
2022	N/A	Julian Michael Carver	Freshwater		Nominated	
2022	N/A	Tim Waggoner	Halloween Kills		Nominated	
2023	Adapted and Original-General combined	James Swallow	Firewall	Tom Clancy's Splinter Cell	Won	
2023	Adapted and Original-General combined	Cath Lauria	Black Cat: Discord	Marvel Comics	Nominated	
2023	Adapted and Original-General combined	James Moran	The Fires of Pompeii	Doctor Who	Nominated	
2023	Adapted and Original-General combined	Terrie Moran	Death on the Emerald Isle	Murder She Wrote	Nominated	
2023	Adapted and Original-General combined	Josh Reynolds	The Flower Path	The Legend of the Five Rings	Nominated	
2024	N/A	Pat Cadigan	Ultraman		Won	
2024	N/A	Maria Lewis	Daughter of No One	Assassin's Creed	Nominated	
2024	N/A	Paul Cornell	Secret Invasion	Marvel Comics	Nominated	
2024	N/A	Sarah Cawkwell	Star-Lord	Marvel's Wastelanders	Nominated	
2025	N/A	Tim Waggoner	Terrifier 2		Won	
2025	N/A	Scott Handcock	73 Yards	Doctor Who	Nominated	
2025	N/A	James Hornby	Requiem	Cwej	Nominated	
2025	N/A	James Lovegrove	Doctor Strange: Dimension War	Marvel Comics	Nominated	
2025	N/A	Chris McGuire	Blast from the Past!		Nominated	
2026	N/A	Adam Cesare	The Toxic Avenger: The Official Movie Novelization	The Toxic Avenger	Won	
2026	N/A	Christian Francis	In The Mouth of Madness		Nominated	
2026	N/A	John Passarella	Return to Silent Hill: The Official Movie Novelization		Nominated	
2026	N/A	Josh Reynolds	Return of the Monster Men		Nominated	
2026	N/A	Tim Waggoner	Terrifier 3: The Official Movie Novelization	Terrifier	Nominated	

=== Original Novel ===
==== General ====
Best Original Novel (General)
Year	Author	Nominated Work	Franchise	Result	Ref
2007	Jeff Mariotte	High Stakes Game	Las Vegas	Won	
2007	Stuart Kaminsky	CSI New York: Blood On The Sun	CSI	Nominated	
2007	Lee Goldberg	Mr. Monk Goes To Hawaii	Monk	Nominated	
2007	Alina Adams	Oakdale Confidential: Secrets Revealed		Nominated	
2008	Lee Goldberg	Mr. Monk And The Two Assistants	Monk	Won	
2008	Stuart M. Kaminsky	CST NY: Deluge	CSI	Nominated	
2008	Jessica Fletcher & Donald Bain	Panning For Murder	Murder She Wrote	Nominated	
2008	Max Allan Collins	Jump Cut	Criminal Minds	Nominated	
2009	Greg Cox	Headhunter	CSI	Won	
2009	Tod Goldberg	The Fix	Burn Notice	Nominated	
2009	Max Allan Collins	Finishing School	Criminal Minds	Nominated	
2010	"Henry Coleman" & Alina Adams	As The World Turns: The Man From Oakdale		Won	
2010	Jeff Mariotte	Brass In Pocket	CSI	Nominated	
2010	William Rabkin	A Mind Is A Terrible Thing To Read	Psych	Nominated	
2011	Nancy Holder	Tough Love	Saving Grace	Won	
2011	Greg Cox	Shock Treatment	CSI	Nominated	
2011	Tod Goldberg	The Giveaway	Burn Notice	Nominated	
2011	Max Allan Collins And Mickey Spillane	The Big Bang	Mike Hammer	Nominated	
2011	Donald Bain	The Queen's Jewels	Murder She Wrote	Nominated	
2011	William Rabkin	The Call Of The Mild	Psych	Nominated	
2012	Max Allan Collins And Mickey Spillane	Kiss Her Goodbye	Mike Hammer	Won	
2012	D.P. Lyle	First Do No Harm	Royal Pains	Nominated	
2012	Tod Goldberg	The Bad Beat	Burn Notice	Nominated	
2013 (Note: General and Speculative Combined)	Robert Jeschonek	Rising Sun, Falling Shadows	Tannhäuser	Won	
2013	Greg Cox	Rings of Time	Star Trek	Nominated	
2013	David Mack	The Persistence of Memory	Star Trek	Nominated	
2013	Tim Pratt	City of the Fallen Sky	Pathfinder	Nominated	
2013	Marsheila Rockwell	Skein of Shadows	Dungeons and Dragons Online	Nominated	
2013	Ari Marmell	The Abomination Vault	Darksiders	Nominated	
2013	Max Allan Collins And Mickey Spillane	Lady, Go Die!	Mike Hammer	Nominated	
2014	Greg Cox	The Bestseller Job	Leverage	Won	
2014	Hy Conrad	Mr. Monk Helps Himself	Monk	Won	
2014	Donald Bain	Close-Up on Murder	Murder She Wrote	Nominated	
2014	Keith R. A. DeCandido	The Zoo Job	Leverage	Nominated	
2014	Michael A. Black	Sleeping Dragons	The Executioner	Nominated	
2015	Andrew Kaplan	Saul's Game	Homeland	Won	
2015	James Swallow	Deadline	24	Nominated	
2015	Don Bain	Death of a Blue Blood	Murder She Wrote	Nominated	
2015	Mickey Spillane and Max Allan Collins	King of the Weeds	Mike Hammer	Nominated	
2015	Karen Dionne	Uncommon Denominator	The Killing	Nominated	
2016	David Mack	Rogue	24	Won	
2016	Adam Christopher	The Ghost Line	Elementary	Nominated	
2016	Mickey Spillane & Max Allan Collins	Kill Me, Darling		Nominated	
2016	Michael A. Black	Desert Falcons	Don Pendleton's Mack Bolan	Nominated	
2017	Ace Atkins	Robert B. Parker's Slow Burn		Won	
2017	Dayton Ward	Trial by Fire	24	Nominated	
2017	Michael Black	Missile Intercept	Don Pendleton's The Executioner	Nominated	
2017	Mickey Spillane and Max Allan Collins	Murder Never Knocks		Nominated	
2017	Mark Greaney	Tom Clancy's True Faith and Allegiance		Nominated	
2018	Michael A. Black	Fatal Prescription	Don Pendleton's The Executioner	Won	
2018	Mickey Spillane and Max Allan Collins	The Will to Kill	Mike Hammer	Nominated	
2018	Reed Farrel Coleman	Robert B. Parker's The Hangman's Sonnet	Jesse Stone	Nominated	
2019	Jeff Mariotte	The Jaguar's Claw	Narcos	Won	
2019	Quincy J. Allen	Shadow of Ruin	Colt the Outlander	Nominated	
2019	Michael A. Black	Dying Art	The Executioner	Nominated	
2019	Mickey Spillane & Max Allan Collins	Killing Town	Mike Hammer	Nominated	
2019	Mike Maden	Line of Sight	Tom Clancy	Nominated	
2020	Reed Farrel Coleman	The Bitterest Pill		Won	
2020	Max Allan Collins	Murder, My Love		Nominated	
2020	John Land	A Taste For Murder	Murder, She Wrote	Nominated	
2021	James Swallow & Josh Reynolds	Day Zero	Watch Dogs Legion	Won	
2021	Max Allan Collins	Masquerade for Murder		Nominated	
2021	Rae Carson	The Rise of Skywalker	Star Wars	Nominated	
2021	David J. Howe	Mindgame		Nominated	
2022	Amanda Bridgeman	Patient Zero	Pandemic	Won	
2022	Terrie Farley Moran	Deboniar in Death	Murder She Wrote	Nominated	
2022	Max Allan Collins	Shootout at Sugar Creek		Nominated	
2023 (Note: Adapted and Original-General combined)	James Swallow	Firewall	Tom Clancy's Splinter Cell	Won	
2023	Cath Lauria	Black Cat: Discord	Marvel Comics	Nominated	
2023	James Moran	The Fires of Pompeii	Doctor Who	Nominated	
2023	Terrie Moran	Death on the Emerald Isle	Murder She Wrote	Nominated	
2023	Josh Reynolds	The Flower Path	The Legend of the Five Rings	Nominated	
2024	Josh Reynolds	Three Oaths	Legend of the Five Rings	Won	
2024	Jessica Fletcher & Terrie Farley Moran	Fit for Murder	Murder, She Wrote	Nominated	
2024	Robbie MacNiven	Cold Reboot	Watch Dogs Legion	Nominated	
2025	Josh Reynolds	A Bitter Taste	A Daidoji Shin Mystery	Won	
2025	Marie Bilodeau	Off Beat (Top Drek #1)	Shadowrun	Nominated	
2025	Jessica Fletcher & Terrie Farley Moran	Murder Backstage	Murder, She Wrote	Nominated	
2025	Justin Sloan	Quantum Paradox		Nominated	
2026	Raymond Benson	The Hook and the Eye	Felix Leiter	Won	
2026	James Hornby	The Midas Touch		Nominated	
2026	Max Allan Collins	Return of the Maltese Falcon		Nominated	
2026	Barbara Early	Snowy With a Chance of Murder	Murder, She Wrote	Nominated	
2026	Sarah Cawkwell	Echoes of Memory	Thunder’s Edge	Nominated	
2026	Terrie Farley Moran	The Body in the Trees	Murder, She Wrote	Nominated	

==== Speculative ====
Best Original Novel (Speculative)
Year	Author	Nominated Work	Franchise	Result	Ref
2007	Jeff Mariotte and Steve Niles	Rumors Of The Undead	Thirty Days Of Night	Won	
2007	David R. George III	Star Trek Crucible: Mccoy—Provenance Of Shadows	Star Trek	Nominated	
2007	Sonny Whitelaw & Elizabeth Christensen	Stargate Atlantis: Exogenesis	Stargate	Nominated	
2007	James Swallow	Faith & Fire	Warhammer 40K	Nominated	
2007	Nathan Long	Orc Slayer	Warhammer	Nominated	
2008	Elizabeth Christensen	Stargate Atlantis: Casualties Of War	Stargate	Won	
2008	Kevin J. Anderson	Last Days Of Krypton	DC Comics	Nominated	
2008	Keith R.A. Decandido	Star Trek: The Next Generation – Q&A	Star Trek	Nominated	
2009	James Swallow	Star Trek Terok Nor: Day Of The Vipers	Star Trek	Won	
2009	Doranna Durgin	Ghost Whisperer: Revenge		Nominated	
2009	Samantha Henderson	Ravenloft: The Covenant, Heaven's Bones	Dungeons & Dragons	Nominated	
2009	Holly Scott & Jaime Duncan	Stargate SG-1: Hydra	Stargate	Nominated	
2010	Greg Cox	Terminator Salvation: Cold War	Terminator	Won	
2010	Kevin J. Anderson	Enemies & Allies		Won	
2010	Dayton Ward	Star Trek Vanguard: Open Secrets	Star Trek	Nominated	
2010	Keith R.A. Decandido	Star Trek: A Singular Destiny	Star Trek	Nominated	
2010	Nathan Long	Shamanslayer—A Gotrek and Felix Novel	Warhammer	Nominated	
2011	Nathan Long	Warhammer: Bloodborn: Ulrika The Vampire	Warhammer	Won	
2011	Matt Forbeck And Jeff Grubb	Ghosts Of Ascalon	Guild Wars	Nominated	
2011	David Mack	Star Trek: Mirror Universe: The Sorrows Of The Empire	Star Trek	Nominated	
2011	Sean Williams	Star Wars: Force Unleashed II	Star Wars	Nominated	
2011	Keith R.A. Decandido	Heart Of The Dragon	Supernatural	Nominated	
2012	Erin M. Evans	Dungeons & Dragons – Forgotten Realms: Brimstone Angels	Dungeons and Dragons	Won	
2012	Christa Faust	Coyote's Kiss	Supernatural	Nominated	
2012	John Jackson Miller	Knight Errant	Star Wars	Nominated	
2012	Marshiela Rockwell	The Shard Axe	Dungeons and Dragons	Nominated	
2012	A.C. Crispin	The Price Of Freedom	Pirates Of The Caribbean	Nominated	
2013 (Note: General and Speculative Combined)	Robert Jeschonek	Rising Sun, Falling Shadows	Tannhäuser	Won	
2013	Greg Cox	Rings of Time	Star Trek	Nominated	
2013	David Mack	The Persistence of Memory	Star Trek	Nominated	
2013	Tim Pratt	City of the Fallen Sky	Pathfinder	Nominated	
2013	Marsheila Rockwell	Skein of Shadows	Dungeons and Dragons Online	Nominated	
2013	Ari Marmell	The Abomination Vault	Darksiders	Nominated	
2013	Max Allan Collins And Mickey Spillane	Lady, Go Die!	Mike Hammer	Nominated	
2014	John Jackson Miller	Kenobi	Star Wars	Won	
2014	Dayton Ward	From History's Shadow		Nominated	
2014	Alice Henderson	Fresh Meat	Supernatural	Nominated	
2014	Tim Waggoner	The Roads not Taken	Supernatural	Nominated	
2014	Christa Faust	The Zodiac Paradox	Fringe	Nominated	
2015	James Sutter	The Redemption Engine	Pathfinder	Won	
2015	Christa Faust	Sins of the Father	Fringe	Won	
2015	Keith R. A. DeCandido	Children of the Revolution	Sleepy Hollow	Nominated	
2015	John Passarella	Chopping Block	Grimm	Nominated	
2015	David Mack	Disavowed	Star Trek	Nominated	
2015	Greg Cox	Foul Deeds Will Rise	Star Trek	Nominated	
2015	Tim Waggoner	The Killing Time	Grimm	Nominated	
2016	Dayton Ward	Armageddon's Arrow	Star Trek The Next Generation	Won	
2016	Jonathan Maberry	Ghostwalkers	Deadlands	Nominated	
2016	Troy Denning	Last Light	HALO	Nominated	
2016	Matt Forbeck	New Blood	HALO	Nominated	
2016	Josh Vogt	Forge of Ashes	Pathfinder	Nominated	
2016	R. L. King	Borrowed Time	Shadowrun	Nominated	
2016	David Mack	Star Trek Seekers 3: Long Shot	Star Trek	Nominated	
2017	Christie Golden	Heresy	Assassin's Creed	Won	
2017	David Annandale	Warden of the Blade	Warhammer 40,000	Nominated	
2017	Dayton Ward	Elusive Salvation	Star Trek	Nominated	
2017	Tim Waggoner	Mythmaker	Supernatural	Nominated	
2018	Greg Cox	The Librarians and the Mother Goose Chase	The Librarians	Won	
2018	Peter J. Wacks, Guy Anthony Demarco, and Josh Voight	Solar Singularity	Interface Zero	Nominated	
2018	Matt Forbeck	Legacy of Onyx	Halo	Nominated	
2018	Christie Golden	Battlefront II: Inferno Squad	Star Wars	Nominated	
2018	David Mack	Desperate Hours	Star Trek Discovery	Nominated	
2018	Yvonne Navarro	The Usual Sacrifices	Supernatural	Nominated	
2019	Dayton Ward	Drastic Measures	Star Trek Discovery	Won	
2019	Alex White	The Cold Forge	Alien	Nominated	
2019	Troy Denning	Silent Storm	HALO	Nominated	
2019	James Swallow	Fear Itself	Star Trek Discovery	Nominated	
2019	Christie Golden	Before the Storm	Warcraft	Nominated	
2020	David Mack	Collateral Damage	Star Trek TNG	Won	
2020	Greg Cox	Batman, The Court of Owls	DC Comics	Won	
2020	James Lovegrove	The Magnificent Nine	Firefly	Nominated	
2020	John Jackson Miller	The Enterprise War	Star Trek Discovery	Nominated	
2020	Delilah S. Dawson	Black Spire	Star Wars: Galaxy Edge	Nominated	
2020	Gav Thorpe	The Red Feast	Warhammer	Nominated	
2021	John Jackson Miller	Die Standing	Star Trek Discovery	Won	
2021	James Lovegrove	The Ghost Machine	Firefly	Nominated	
2021	Greg Keyes	The Extinction Key	MCU Avengers	Nominated	
2021	David Mack	More Beautiful Than Death	Star Trek (Kelvin Timeline)	Nominated	
2021	Dayton Ward	Agents of Influence	Star Trek (TOS)	Nominated	
2022	John Jackson Miller	Rogue Elements	Star Trek Picard	Won	
2022	Carrie Harris	Witches Unleashed	Marvel Comics	Nominated	
2022	Richard Lee Byers	Rebels of Vanaheim	Marvel Comics	Nominated	
2022	David Mack	Coda Book III — Oblivion's Gate	Star Trek	Nominated	
2022	Evan Dicken	To Chart the Clouds	Legend of the Five Rings	Nominated	
2023	John Jackson Miller	High Country	Star Trek Strange New Worlds	Won	
2023	Anthony Reynolds	Ruination	League of Legends	Nominated	
2023	Carrie Harris	Shadow Avengers	Marvel Crisis Protocol	Nominated	
2023	David Mack	Harm's Way	Star Trek Original Series	Nominated	
2023	Christie Golden	Sylvanas	World of Warcraft	Nominated	
2024	David Mack	Firewall	Star Trek Picard	Won	
2024	Kate Heartfield	The Resurrection Plot	Assassin's Creed	Nominated	
2024	Marsheila Rockwell	The Hunger	Marvel Zombies	Nominated	
2024	Derek Tyler Attico	The Autobiography of Benjamin Sisko	Star Trek: Deep Space Nine	Nominated	
2024	George Mann	The Eye of Darkness	Star Wars	Nominated	
2025	Una McCormack	Asylum	Star Trek – Strange New Worlds	Won	
2025	Erin M. Evans	The Gift of Guthix	RuneScape	Nominated	
2025	Carrie Harris	The Forbidden Visions of Lucius Galloway	Arkham Horror	Nominated	
2025	John Jackson Miller	Resurrection	Batman	Nominated	
2025	Rosiee Thor	Aim to Misbehave	Firefly	Nominated	
2026	John Jackson Miller	Revolution	Batman	Won	
2026	David Mack	Ring of Fire	Star Trek: Strange New Worlds	Nominated	
2026	Delilah S. Dawson	Ravenloft: Heir of Strahd	Dungeons & Dragons	Nominated	
2026	Bryan Young	Outfoxed	BattleTech	Nominated	
2026	Shaun Hamill	Suffer the Witch	Solomon Kane	Nominated	
2026	Tim Lebbon	Song of The Slain	Conan	Nominated	
2026	Tim Waggoner	Spawn of the Serpent God	Conan	Nominated	

=== Young Adult ===
Best Original Novel (Young Adult)
Year	Author	Nominated Work	Franchise	Result	Ref
2010	Aaron Rosenberg	The Novel	Bandslam	Won	
2010	Stacia Deutsch And Rhody Cohon	Cloudy With A Chance Of Meatballs	Joan Marie Verba	Nominated	
2010		Deadly Danger	Thunderbirds	Nominated	
2011	Nathan Meyer	Aldwyns Academy	Dungeons & Dragons	Won	
2011	Joan Marie Verba	Situation Critical	Thunderbirds	Nominated	
2011	Aaron Rosenberg	The Junior Novel	Alpha & Omega	Nominated	
2012	Joan Marie Verba	Extreme Hazard	Thunderbirds	Won	
2012	Rory Growler (Ian Pike)	Monster Manners	Me & My Monsters	Nominated	
2012	Stacia Deutsch And Rhody Cohon	The Smurfs Movie Tie-In		Nominated	
2014	Paul Kupperberg	Kevin	Archie Comics:	Won	
2014	Stacia Deutsch	Cloudy With a Chance of Meatballs 2		Nominated	
2014	Tracey West	The Croods		Nominated	
2015	Jennifer Brozek	The Nellus Academy Incident	Battletech	Won	
2015	Garth Nix and Sean Williams	Blood Ties	Spirit Animals	Nominated	
2015	Tracey West	Penguins of Madagascar		Nominated	
2018	Jonathan Maberry	Devil's Advocate	X-Files Origins	Won	
2018	Cavan Scott	Star Wars Adventures in Wild Space – The Cold	Star Wars	Nominated	
2018	Keith R. A. DeCandido	Warriors Three: Godhood's End	Marvel Comics	Nominated	
2019	Alethea Kontis	Besphinxed	Harmswood Academy	Won	
2019	Jonathan Maberry	Broken Lands		Nominated	
2019	Chris Lynch	Curse of the Mirror Clowns	The Lucy Wilson Mysteries	Nominated	
2019	Tracey West	Smallfoot		Nominated	
2019	Michael Kogge	The Last Jedi Junior Novel	Star Wars	Nominated	
2019	Elizabeth Schaefer	The Last Jedi Movie Storybook	Star Wars	Nominated	
2020	Cavan Scott	Attack of the Necron	Warhammer Adventures	Won	
2020	Tom Huddleston	City of Lifestone	Warhammer Adventures	Nominated	
2020	Jennifer Brozek	Iron Dawn	Battletech: Rogue Academy	Nominated	
2020	Cassandra Rose Clarke	Battle Born	Halo	Nominated	
2020	John Peel	The Midnight People	The Lucy Wilson Mysteries	Nominated	
2021	Michael Kogge	The Rise of Skywalker	Star Wars	Won	
2021	Diana Peterfreund	In the Study With the Wrench		Nominated	
2021	Carrie Harris	Liberty and Justice for All		Nominated	
2021	Matt Forbeck	The Rise of the Arch-Illager	Minecraft Dungeons	Nominated	
2021	Sheela Chari	The Unexplainable Disappearance of Mars Patel		Nominated	
2022	Robbie MacNiven	First Team	Xavier's Institute	Won	
2022	Jennifer Brozek	Crimson Night	Battletech	Nominated	
2022	Steven Savile	The Bear King		Nominated	
2022	Barry Lyga	The Legends of Forever	The Flash: Crossover Crisis Book Three	Nominated	
2022	Stacia Deutsch	Friendship Feature	Jessie Files	Nominated	
2022	E. C. Myers	Roman Holiday	RWBY	Nominated	
2023	Tristan Palmgren	Squirrel Girl Universe	Marvel Comics	Won	
2023	Cassandra Rose Clarke	A Dangerous Trade	Star Trek Prodigy	Nominated	
2023	George Mann	Quest for the Hidden City	Star Wars: The High Republic	Nominated	
2023	George Ivanoff	Memories of the Future	The Mystery of Lucy Wilson	Nominated	
2023	David Guymer	Tower of Nerek	Descent: Legends of the Dark	Nominated	
2024	Jennifer Brozek	Auditions: A Mosaic Run Collection	Shadowrun	Won	
2024	Vera Strange	Circle of Ter-ROAR	Disney Chills	Nominated	
2024	Mari Mancusi	Set in Stone	Disney Twisted Tales	Nominated	
2024	Matt Forbeck	Return of the Piglins	Minecraft	Nominated	
2025	Allison Saft	Wings of Starlight		Won	
2025	Martin Baines & George Ivanoff	Down in the London Underground	Doctor Who	Nominated	
2025	George Mann	Tears of the Nameless	Star Wars: The High Republic	Nominated	
2025	Iain McLaughlin	The One That Got Away	The Raccoons	Nominated	
2025	Linsey Miller	Prince of Glass & Midnight		Nominated	
2025	Brittney Morris	Heatwaves	Life is Strange	Nominated	
2026	Jennifer Brody	Starcourt Mall Escape		Won	
2026	Eugene Myers	The Lonely Ones		Nominated	
2026	George Ivanoff	Kidnapped	The Tomorrow People	Nominated	
2026	Carrie Harris	Snagged		Nominated	
2026	Una McCormack	Robot Revolution	Doctor Who	Nominated	

=== Short Story ===
Best Short Story
Year	Author	Nominated Work	Franchise	Result	Ref
2014	Max Allan Collins and Mickey Spillane	So Long, Chief		Won	
2014	Michael Jan Friedman	Savior		Nominated	
2014	Robert Greenberger	Redemption		Nominated	
2014	Jennifer Brozek	Locks and Keys		Nominated	
2014	Christine M. Thompson	Mirror Image		Nominated	
2014	David Annandale	The Dark Hollows of Memory		Nominated	
2015	Max Allan Collins and Mickey Spillane	It's in the Book	Mike Hammer	Won	
2015	Josh Vogt	Hunter's Folly	Pathfinder	Nominated	
2015	Diana Botsford	Perceptions	Stargate	Nominated	
2015	Steven Savile	Queen Sacrifice	Pathfinder	Nominated	
2015	Jennifer Brozek	Written in the Wind	Tales of Valdemar	Nominated	
2016	Max Allan Collins and Mickey Spillane	Fallout	Mike Hammer The Strand	Won	
2016	Jason M. Hardy	Swamp of Spirits	Shadowrun: World of Shadows	Nominated	
2016	Keith R. A. DeCandido	Back in El Paso My Life Will Be Worthless	The X-Files: Trust No One	Nominated	
2016	Paul Crilley	Dusk	The X-Files: Trust No One	Nominated	
2016	Brian Keene	Non Gratum Anus Rodentum	The X-Files: Trust No One	Nominated	
2016	Kevin J. Anderson	Statues	The X-Files: Trust No One	Nominated	
2017	Yvonne Navarro	Love Lost	X-Files	Won	
2017	Mickey Spillane & Max Allan Collins	A Dangerous Cat		Nominated	
2017	Jon McGoran	Drive Time	X-Files	Nominated	
2017	George Ivanoff	An Eye for an Eye	X-Files	Nominated	
2017	Glenn Greenberg	XXX	X-Files	Nominated	
2018	Jonathan Maberry	Banana Republic		Won	
2018	Keith DeCandido	Ganbatte		Won	
2018	John Jackson Miller	Murderers' Row		Nominated	
2018	Bob Mayer	Pacing Place		Nominated	
2018	Sarah Stegall	Rear Guard		Nominated	
2018	Peter Wacks and David Boop	Storm Blood		Nominated	
2019	Rachel Harrison	The Darkling Hours	Warhammer	Won	
2019	Craig A. Reed Jr.	End of the Road	Battletech	Nominated	
2019	Travis Heermann	Swords of Light and Darkness	Battletech	Nominated	
2019	Peter	No Hero	Warhammer	Nominated	
2019	John French	The Passing of Angels	Warhammer	Nominated	
2020	Chris A. Jackson	Cutter & Razz	Tales of Basil and Meobis Fresh Hells	Won	
2020	Shane Lacy Hensley	Cookie	Deadlands Straight Out of Tombstone	Nominated	
2020	Bobby Nash	The Girl's Best Friend Matter	Yours Truly, Johnny Dollar	Nominated	
2020	George Ivanoff	Pure History	Lethbridge-Stewart, the HAVOC Files	Nominated	
2020	Jean Rabe	The Queen Slayer	Dragonband, Women of the Crystal Coast	Nominated	
2021	Christie Golden	Stone by Stone		Won	
2021	M. K. Hutchins	Useful Parasites		Won	
2021	Robbie MacNiven	Extermination Examination		Nominated	
2021	Monica Valentinelli	Scritch, Scratch		Nominated	
2021	Gareth Hanrahan	A View from Olympus		Nominated	
2022	Harlan James	Bon Temps	Black Panther: Tales of Wakanda	Won	
2022	Davide Mana	All My Friends Are Monsters	Arkham Horror The Devourer Below	Nominated	
2022	Neil Kleid	Kid Omega Faces the Music	School of X	Nominated	
2022	Jean Rabe	Distress Signals	Renegade Legion: Voices of Varuna	Nominated	
2022	Marsheila Rockwell	Stepping Stones	Renegade Legion: Voices of Varuna	Nominated	
2023	Amanda Bridgeman	Reconsecration	Warhammer 40,000 The Emperor's Finest	Won	
2023	Maurice Broaddus	Night Doctors	Alien vs. Predator Ultimate Prey	Nominated	
2023	K. Aresnault Rivera	The Family Man	Magic	Nominated	
2023	Michael Kogge	The Monster	Predator: Eyes of the Demon	Nominated	
2023	George Ivanoff	The Lady Jessica Affair	Unit The Benton Files 2	Nominated	
2024	David Mack	Lost and Founder	Star Trek: Deep Space Nine	Won	
2024	Tim Waggoner	Singing a Deeper Song	Unioverse	Nominated	
2024	Carrie Harris	A Forbidden Meal	Warhammer 40,000	Nominated	
2024	Jennifer Brozek	Needs Must When Evil Bides	Valdemar	Nominated	
2024	Jonathan Maberry	The Toll of Darkness and Light	Diablo	Nominated	
2024	Deborah Daughetee	Touch of Silk	Kolchak the Night Stalker	Nominated	
2024	Keith R.A. DeCandido	Work Worth Doing	Star Trek: Discovery	Nominated	
2025	David Mack	Family History	Star Trek	Won	
2025	Catherynne M. Valente	The Lilac and the Stone	World of Warcraft	Won	
2025	Robert Jeschonek	The Tomorrow Ghost	Moonstone Triple Threat	Nominated	
2025	Bobby Nash	O' Deadly Deathtrap	Remo Williams: The Destroyer: The Adventures Continue!	Nominated	
2025	Tim Waggoner	Here There Be Monsters	Heartwood: A Mythago Wood Anthology	Nominated	
2026	Alfie Shaw	“Aftercare” in The Adventures After	Doctor Who	Won	
2026	Julia Vee	“Three Times Lucky”	Reclusion: The Game	Nominated	
2026	Robert Jeschonek	“Ghost Station Zero”	Cold War Cthulhu	Nominated	
2026	Tim Waggoner	“Conan: Marked for Death”	Heroic Legends	Nominated	

=== Audio Drama ===
Best Audio Drama
Year	Author	Nominated Work	Franchise	Result	Ref
2012	Max Allan Collins & Mickey Spillane	Encore For Murder	Mike Hammer	Won	
2012	D. Lynn Smith	The Lost Girl	Dark Shadows	Nominated	
2012	Scott Andrews	All The Kings Horses	Highlander	Nominated	
2012	Cavan Scott & Mark Wright	The Many Deaths Of Jo Grant	Doctor Who	Nominated	
2013	Nev Fountain	The Eternal Actress	Dark Shadows	Won	
2013	Marty Ross	Dress Me in Dark Dreams	Dark Shadows	Nominated	
2013	Cavan Scott & Mark Wright	Companion Chronicles:Project Nirvana	Doctor Who	Nominated	
2014	Cavan Scott & Mark Wright	The Armageddon Storm	Blake's 7	Won	
2014	Mark Thomas Passmore	The Phantom Bride	Dark Shadows	Nominated	
2014	Cody Quijano-Schell	The Flip Side	Dark Shadows	Nominated	
2015	John Dorney	Iterations of I	Doctor Who	Won	
2015	Nev Fountain	The Darkest Shadow	Dark Shadows	Nominated	
2015	Mark Thomas Passmore	The Devil Cat	Dark Shadows	Nominated	
2015	George Mann	Fortuitis	Blake's 7	Nominated	
2015	Cavan Scott	The Skinsaw Murders	Pathfinder Legends	Nominated	
2016	John Dorney	The Red Lady	Doctor Who	Won	
2016	Alan Flanagan, Will Howells and Joseph Lidster	Bloodlust	Dark Shadows	Nominated	
2016	Penelope Faith	In the Twinkling of an Eye	Dark Shadows	Nominated	
2016	Cavan Scott	Mummy's Mask: Empty Graves	Pathfinder Legends	Nominated	
2016	Jonathan Morris	Damaged Goods	Doctor Who	Nominated	
2017	Roy Gill	Blood & Fire	Dark Shadows	Won	
2017	Joseph Lidster	Broken	Torchwood	Nominated	
2017	David Llewellyn	Uncanny Valley	Torchwood	Nominated	
2017	John Pritchard	Mouthless Dead	Doctor Who	Nominated	
2018	John French	Agent of the Throne, Blood and Lies	Warhammer 40,000	Won	
2018	David Bartlett	Across the Darkened City	Doctor Who	Nominated	
2018	Matt Fitton	Cold Vengeance	Doctor Who	Nominated	
2018	Scott Handcock	Cascade	Torchwood	Nominated	
2018	Lizzie Hopley	The Dying Room	Torchwood	Nominated	
2019	A. K. Benedict	The Calendar Man	Doctor Who	Won	
2019	Mark Wright	The Way Ahead	Blake's 7	Nominated	
2019	Lila Whelan	The Girl Beneath the Water	Dark Shadows	Nominated	
2019	John Dorney	The Invention of Death	Doctor Who	Nominated	
2019	James Goss and Guy Adams	The War Master: The Master of Callous	Doctor Who	Nominated	
2020	Roy Gill	The Creeping Death	Doctor Who – 10 Doctor Adventures	Won	
2020	Scott Handcock	Concealed Weapon	Diary of River Song	Nominated	
2020	John Pritchard	Daybreak	Doctor Who – Companion Chronicles	Nominated	
2020	Christopher Cooper	Sargasso	Torchwood	Nominated	
2020	Alex Worley	Watcher in the Rain	Warhammer	Nominated	
2021	Matt Fitton	Out of Time	Doctor Who	Won	
2021	Tim Foley	Tropical Beach Sounds and Other Relaxing Seascapes #4	Torchwood	Nominated	
2021	Tracey Ann Baines	The Enemy of My Enemy	Doctor Who	Nominated	
2021	Carrie Thompson	He Kills Me, He Kills Me Not	Doctor Who	Nominated	
2021	Scott Handcock	Save Our Souls	Torchwood	Nominated	
2022	Lizzie Hopley	The Curse of Lady Macbeth	Doctor Who: The Ninth Doctor Adventures	Won	
2022	Lisa McMullin	Girl Deconstructed	Doctor Who	Nominated	
2022	A. K. Benedict	The Lost Resort	Doctor Who	Nominated	
2022	John Dorney	Monsters in Metropolis	Doctor Who: The Ninth Doctor Adventures	Nominated	
2022	Tim Foley	The Truth of Peladon	Doctor Who: Peladon	Nominated	
2022	Nicholas Briggs	The Annihilators	Doctor Who: The Third Doctor Adventures	Nominated	
2023	Paul Cornell and Sebastian Baczkiewicz	Firewall	Tom Clancy's Splinter Cell	Won	
2023	Lizbeth Myles	Peake Season	Doctor Who	Nominated	
2023	James Moran	Parts 1 and 2	Previously Next Time	Nominated	
2023	R. Valentine	He Who Fights Monsters	Doctor Who – The War Doctor Begins	Nominated	
2023	Roy Gill	Albie's Angels	Doctor Who	Nominated	
2024	Alfie Shaw	Sins of the Flesh	Doctor Who	Won	
2024	Max Kashevsky	All's Fair	Doctor Who	Nominated	
2024	John Dorney	Face to Face	Doctor Who	Nominated	
2024	Tim Foley	Pursuit of the Nightjar	Doctor Who	Nominated	
2024	Georgia Cook	Spirit of the Season	Doctor Who	Nominated	
2025	Tim Foley	Archipelago	Doctor Who	Won	
2025	James Swallow	Blood Moon - A Cage of Sky	Star Cops	Won	
2025	Katherine Armitage	Nowhere, Never	Doctor Who	Nominated	
2025	John Dorney	The Krillitane Feint	Doctor Who	Nominated	
2025	James Moran	Cass-cade	Doctor Who	Nominated	
2026	Kirsten Beyer & David Mack	Khan	Star Trek	Won	
2026	Georgia Cook	Party Favours	Halloween	Nominated	
2026	Alfie Shaw	The War Doctor Rises: Fallen Heroes	Doctor Who	Nominated	
2026	Lauren Mooney & Stewart Pringle	Zygon Century – 1935: The Miracle of Pendour Cove	Doctor Who	Nominated	
2026	Tim Foley	Hooklight	Doctor Who	Nominated	

=== Graphic Novel ===
Best Graphic Novel
Year	Author	Nominated Work	Franchise	Result	Ref
2022	Emma Vieceli	Coming Home	Life is Strange	Won	
2022	Jody Houser	The Master Plan: A Doctor Who Comic Graphic Novel	Missy	Nominated	
2022	Greg Pak	Darth Vader Vol 2: Into the Fire	Star Wars	Nominated	
2023	David Avallone, Rodney Barnes, Jonathan Maberry, Gabriel Hardman, Peter David, James Aquilone, R. C. Matheson, Nancy A. Collins, Kim Newman, James Chambers, Tim Waggoner, & Steve Niles	Kolchak the Night Stalker		Won	
2023	Paul Cornell	The Drawing of the Cards	Wild Cards	Nominated	
2024	Jody Houser	The Mighty Nine Origins	Critical Role	Won	
2024	Andy Diggle	Dragontooth	The Expanse	Nominated	
2024	Rik Hoskin	Forbidden Song	Red Rising	Nominated	
2024	John Jackson Miller and James Mishler	The Savage Storm	Skull and Bones	Nominated	
2024	George Mann	The Nameless Terror	Star Wars	Nominated	
2025	Anthony Horowitz & Antony Johnston, Amrit Birdi	Snakehead	Alex Rider	Won	
2025	Jake Black, Marc Ellerby	Finals Week: Wrath of Beth	Rick and Morty	Nominated	
2025	Keith R.A. DeCandido	Infinite Darkness: The Beginning	Resident Evil	Nominated	
2025	Rik Hoskin, Marcio Abreu	The Great Hunt	The Wheel of Time	Nominated	
2025	Jonathan Maberry, Bruno Abdias	Godzilla vs. Cthulhu		Nominated	
2025	George Mann, illustrated by Maan House	The Willow King	Dark Souls	Nominated	
2026	Eric Campbell & Jody Houser	The Rise of Hellfire	Stranger Things and Dungeons & Dragons	Won	
2026	Jake Black & Daniel Kibblesmith	Rick vs. the Universe - Beth Till Death	Rick and Morty	Nominated	
2026	Chris Ryall	Francis Ford Coppola’s Megalopolis		Nominated	
2026	Julian Michael Carver	Frostbite	Commando	Nominated	

== Grandmaster ==
The Grandmaster Award honours those who have a long history of writing and promoting Tie In writing and is also referred to as the Faust Award. It is named after Frederick Faust, creator of Doctor Kildare.

- 2007: Donald Bain
- 2008: Alan Dean Foster
- 2009: Keith R.A. DeCandido
- 2010: William Johnston
- 2011: Peter David
- 2012: Kevin J. Anderson
- 2013: A. C. Crispin
- 2014: Diane Duane
- 2015: Terrance Dicks
- 2016: Timothy Zahn
- 2017: Christie Golden
- 2018: Greg Cox
- 2019: Nancy Holder
- 2020: Jean Rabe
- 2021: Max Allan Collins
- 2022: David Mack
- 2023: Michael Stackpole
- 2024: James Reasoner
- 2025: Dayton Ward
- 2026: Marv Wolfman

== See also ==
- Scribes Society, an organisation of Legal Writers who also have an awards programme
