= Urbana, Missouri =

City in the United States

- City
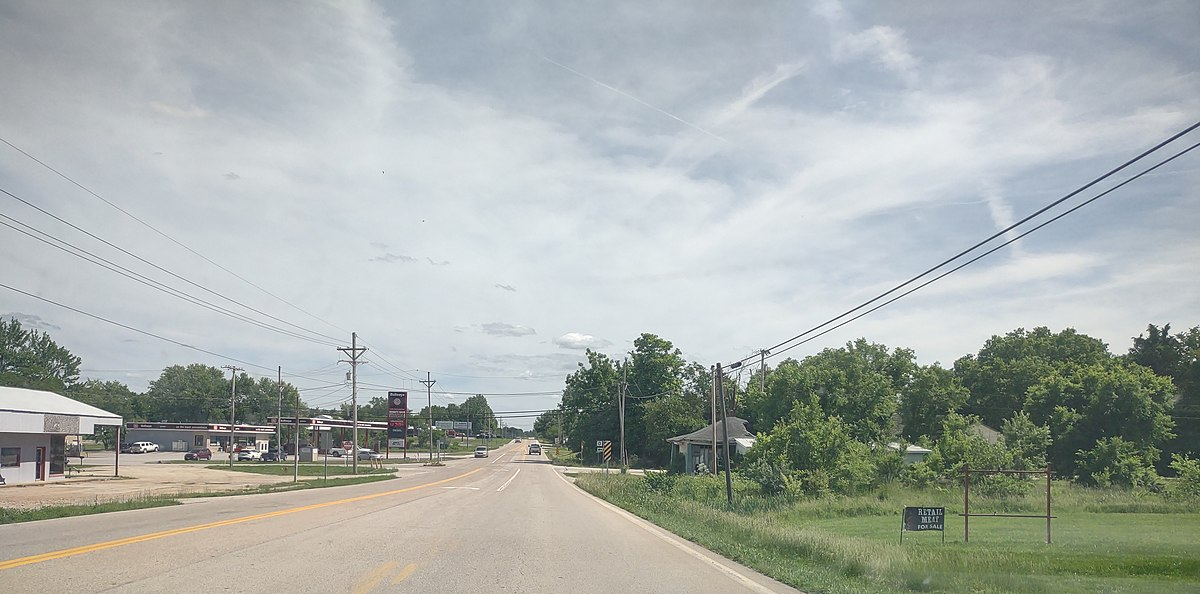

- Location of Urbana, Missouri
- Coordinates: 37°50′36″N 93°10′03″W
- Country: United States
- State: Missouri
- County: Dallas

Area
  - Total: 0.96 sq mi (2.49 km^{2})
  - Land: 0.96 sq mi (2.49 km^{2})
  - Water: 0 sq mi (0.00 km^{2})
- Elevation: 1,034 ft (315 m)

Population (2020)
  - Total: 387
  - Density: 402.1/sq mi (155.27/km^{2})
- Time zone: UTC-6 (Central (CST))
  - Summer (DST): UTC-5 (CDT)
- ZIP code: 65767
- Area code: 417
- FIPS code: 29-75310
- GNIS feature ID: 2397099

Urbana is a city in Dallas County, Missouri, United States. The population was 387 at the 2020 census. It is part of the Springfield, Missouri Metropolitan Statistical Area.

== History ==
A post office called Urbana has been in operation in Dallas County since 1856. The city was named after Urbana, Illinois, the native home of a share of the early settlers.

== Geography ==
According to the United States Census Bureau, the city has a total area of 0.96 square miles (2.49 km^{2}), all land.

== Demographics ==
Historical population
Census	Pop.	Note	%±
1950	359		—
1960	348		−3.1%
1970	369		6.0%
1980	329		−10.8%
1990	350		6.4%
2000	407		16.3%
2010	417		2.5%
2020	387		−7.2%
U.S. Decennial Census

=== 2010 census ===
As of the census of 2010, there were 417 people, 163 households, and 111 families living in the city. The population density was 434.4 inhabitants per square mile (167.7/km^{2}). There were 200 housing units at an average density of 208.3 per square mile (80.4/km^{2}). The racial makeup of the city was 98.1% White, 0.5% Native American, and 1.4% from two or more races. Hispanic or Latino of any race were 0.7% of the population.

There were 163 households, of which 32.5% had children under the age of 18 living with them, 52.1% were married couples living together, 12.3% had a female householder with no husband present, 3.7% had a male householder with no wife present, and 31.9% were non-families. 27.0% of all households were made up of individuals, and 14.7% had someone living alone who was 65 years of age or older. The average household size was 2.44 and the average family size was 2.95.

The median age in the city was 38.6 years. 25.9% of residents were under the age of 18; 6.7% were between the ages of 18 and 24; 23.8% were from 25 to 44; 24.3% were from 45 to 64; and 19.4% were 65 years of age or older. The gender makeup of the city was 46.8% male and 53.2% female.

=== 2000 census ===
As of the census of 2000, there were 407 people, 173 households, and 103 families living in the city. The population density was 426.2 inhabitants per square mile (164.6/km^{2}). There were 206 housing units at an average density of 215.7 per square mile (83.3/km^{2}). The racial makeup of the city was 97.54% White, 0.25% Native American, and 2.21% from two or more races. Hispanic or Latino of any race were 0.25% of the population.

There were 173 households, out of which 30.1% had children under the age of 18 living with them, 42.8% were married couples living together, 15.6% had a female householder with no husband present, and 39.9% were non-families. 35.3% of all households were made up of individuals, and 20.8% had someone living alone who was 65 years of age or older. The average household size was 2.30 and the average family size was 3.01.

In the city the population was spread out, with 26.0% under the age of 18, 7.4% from 18 to 24, 26.5% from 25 to 44, 20.1% from 45 to 64, and 19.9% who were 65 years of age or older. The median age was 38 years. For every 100 females, there were 79.3 males. For every 100 females age 18 and over, there were 83.5 males.

The median income for a household in the city was $19,236, and the median income for a family was $25,250. Males had a median income of $20,000 versus $14,423 for females. The per capita income for the city was $16,824. About 14.0% of families and 16.5% of the population were below the poverty line, including 17.3% of those under age 18 and 28.4% of those age 65 or over.

== Notable people ==
- Guy Anthony De Marco, speculative fiction author and winner of the HWA Silver Hammer Award
- Travis Pete Timmerman, freed Syrian hostage.
