= Robert T. Jeschonek bibliography =

This is a list of published works of American author, Robert T. Jeschonek.

== Nonfiction ==
- Long Live Glosser's, Pie Press (2014), ISBN 978-0-692-32284-0
- Penn Traffic Forever, Pie Press (2015), ISBN 978-0-996-24802-0
- The Glory of Gable's, Pie Press (2016), ISBN 978-0-998-10971-8
- Richland Mall Rules, Pie Press (2017), ISBN 978-0-998-10976-3
- Authors and Interns: How to Boost Your Publishing Business and Pay It Forward with Student Helpers, Pie Press (2020), ISBN 978-0-9985761-7-6

== Glosser Bros. Holidays Series - Johnstown, Pennsylvania fiction ==
- Christmas at Glosser's, Pie Press (2013). ISBN 978-1-494-23911-4
- Easter at Glosser's, Pie Press (2015). ISBN 978-0-996-24800-6
- Halloween at Glosser's, Pie Press (2015). ISBN 978-0-996-24801-3
- A Glosser's Christmas Love Story, Pie Press (2016). ISBN 978-0-998-10974-9
- Valentine's Day at Glosser's, Pie Press (2019). ISBN 978-0-998-57610-7
- Thanksgiving at Glosser's, Pie Press (2019). ISBN 978-0-998-57613-8
- Fourth of July at Glosser's, Pie Press (2020). ISBN 978-0-9985761-8-3
- Old-Fashioned Bargain Days at Glosser's, Pie Press (2021). ISBN 978-1-7361687-6-9
- Glosser Bros. Holiday Tales, Pie Press (2022). ISBN 979-8-9857769-3-5

== Novels ==
- Dolphin Knight, Pie Press (2010). ISBN 978-1-475-08093-3
- My Favorite Band Does Not Exist, Clarion Books (2011). ISBN 978-0-547-37027-9
- Bloodliner, Pie Press (2011). ISBN 978-1-452-36964-8
- Day 9, Pie Press (2011). ISBN 978-1-466-28449-4
- Sticks and Stones, A Trek Novel, Pie Press (2011). ISBN 978-1-465-90413-3
- Earthshaker, Pie Press (2011). ISBN 978-1-466-38786-7
- Dick by Law, Pie Press (2012). ISBN 978-1-452-35964-9
- The Masked Family, Pie Press (2012). ISBN 978-1-434-88351-3
- Battlenaut Crucible, Pie Press (2012). ISBN 978-0-692-02335-8
- Heaven Bent, Pie Press (2012). ISBN 978-1-301-50488-6
- Tannhäuser: Rising Sun, Falling Shadows, Fantasy Flight Games (2012). ISBN 978-1-616-61180-4
- Death by Polka, Pie Press (2012). ISBN 978-1-494-23891-9
- A Pinstriped Finger's My Only Friend, Pie Press (2013). ISBN 978-0-615-76730-7
- Unbullied, Pie Press (2014). ISBN 978-1-370-54632-9
- Deathlands: Child of Slaughter, (as James Axler) Gold Eagle (2015). ISBN 978-0-373-62634-2
- Starbarian Saga Book One: Horde's Challenge, Pie Press (2019). ISBN 978-1-7361687-4-5
- Starbarian Saga Book Two: Horde's Power, Pie Press (2020). ISBN 978-1-7361687-5-2
- Gaia Files Book One: Dead to the World, (as R.J. Sierra) Aethon Books (2021)
- Gaia Files Book Two: World of Trouble, (as R.J. Sierra) Aethon Books (2021)
- Gaia Files Book Three: Weight of the World, (as R.J. Sierra) Aethon Books (2021)
- Gaia Files Book Four: World on Fire, (as R.J. Sierra) Aethon Books (2021)
- Gray Lady Rising, (with Annie Reed) Blastoff Books (2022) ISBN 979-8-9857769-6-6
- Gray Lady's Revenge, (with Annie Reed) Blastoff Books (2023) ISBN 979-8-9875846-7-5
- Gray Lady's Gambit, (with Annie Reed) Blastoff Books (2025) ISBN 979-8-9925842-1-9
- Power Play: A Gray Lady Novel, (with Annie Reed) Blastoff Books (2025)
- Sir: A Novel, Unforgettable Books (2026) ISBN 979-8-9925842-8-8

== Audio drama ==
- Deathlands 124: Child of Slaughter, (as James Axler) GraphicAudio (2016).
- Deathlands 132: Feeding Frenzy, (as James Axler) GraphicAudio (2018).

== Edited fiction anthologies ==
- Space: 1975, IE Books/Pie Press (2021).
- Legends of Indie Comics: Words Only, Pie Press (2025). ISBN 979-8-9875846-9-9
- Legends of Indie Comics: Words Only, Volume 2, Pie Press (2026). ISBN 979-8-9925842-6-4

== Introductions, Forewords, Afterwords ==
- Foreword to The Boy Who Was Girl by David Gerrold, Star Traveler Press (2025).

== Short fiction collections ==
- Mad Scientist Meets Cannibal, PS Publishing (2008). ISBN 978-1-906-30165-1
- In a Green Dress, Surrounded by Exploding Clowns and Other Stories, Pie Press (2018).
- Blastoff!, Pie Press (2019).
- In the Empire of Underpants and Other Stories, Pie Press (2020).
- Cosmic Conflicts, Blastoff Books (2022).
- 100th Power Volume 1, Blastoff Books (2023).
- 100th Power Volume 2, Blastoff Books (2023).
- 100th Power Volume 3, Blastoff Books (2023).
- Steampunks & Other Heavy Hitters, Blastoff Books (2023).
- Dog and Pony Show, Blastoff Books (2023).
- Time, Warped, Blastoff Books (2024).
- Piggyback and Other Beastly Tales, Blastoff Books (2024).
- Trick-or-Treat in Hell and Other Haunting Tales, Blastoff Books (2025).

== Short fiction ==
- "A Wall of Lisas" in Backroads (1983).
- "Wave a White Flag" in Backroads (1986).
- "Vincent's Secret Students" in Abyss & Apex (2004).
- "The Duck Lover" in Loyalhanna Review (2004).
- "Drifters" in Sciencefictionfantasyhorror.com (2005).
- "Fear of Rain" in Postscripts 8 (2006).
- "Zinzi-zinzi-zinzic" in Darker Matter 3 (2007).
- "The Greatest Serial Killer in the Universe" in Postscripts 12 (2007).
- "Snakeskin" in Postscripts 13 (2007).
- "Why the Cop with a Rose for a Head Wears a Rose-Head Mask" in Helix Speculative Fiction Quarterly 8 (2008).
- "Acirema the Rellik" in Future Americas, DAW Books (2008).
- "Fear of Rain" in ESLI (Russia) (2008).
- "The Wish of a Wish" in Crime Spells, DAW Books (2009).
- "The Love Quest of Smidgen the Snack Cake" in Space and Time 108 (2009).
- "Forced Retirement" in A Thousand Faces, The Quarterly Journal of Superhuman Fiction 9 (2009).
- "Ballad of the Groupie Everlasting" in The Trouble With Heroes, DAW Books (2009).
- "Snowman's Chance in Hell" in Postscripts 20/21, Edison's Frankenstein (2010).
- "One Awake in All the World" in Destination Future, Hadley Rille Books (2010).
- "Shipwreck in the Sky" in Captain Midnight Chronicles, Moonstone (2010).
- "Crimes in the Key of Murder" in Pulp Empire Volume 3 (2010).
- "Flight of the Black Coach" in Story Portals (2011).
- "The Secret of the Ultimate Male Enhancement" in Space and Time 115 (2011).
- "Warning! Do Not Read This Story!" in Postscripts 26/27, Unfit for Eden (2012).
- "Tijuana, Massachusetts" in Mirror Shards Volume 2 (2012).
- "Playing Doctor" in Indian SF (2013).
- "The Spinach Can's Son" in Galaxy's Edge Issue 1 (2013).
- "Chariots of the Godless" in ReDeus: Native Lands (2013).
- "Time, Expressed as an Entrée" in Fiction River: Time Streams (2013).
- "In A Green Dress, Surrounded By Exploding Clowns" in Galaxy's Edge Issue 7 (2014).
- "Stella by Starlight" w/Mike Resnick in Paradox: Stories Inspired by the Fermi Paradox (2014).
- "The Spinach Can's Son" in The Best of Galaxy's Edge 2013–2014 (2014).
- "A Little Song, A Little Dance, A Little Apocalypse Down Your Pants" in Galaxy's Edge Issue 12 (2015).
- "The Messiah Business" in Fiction River: Risk Takers (2015) (Honorable Mention, Year's Best Crime & Mystery Stories (2016).
- "The Spinach Can's Son" in Galaxy's Edge Special Issue (August 2015).
- "In All Your Sparkling Raiment Soar" in Postscripts 34/35, Breakout (2015).
- "The Little Robot's Bedtime Prayer" in Galaxy's Edge Issue 18 (2016).
- "As If My Every Word Has Turned To Glass" in Pulp Literature Issue 11 (Summer 2016).
- "Time, Expressed as an Entrée" in Fiction River Presents: The Unexpected (2016).
- "The First Hollywood Cowboy of the Bropocalypse" in Alephi.com (2017).
- "In a Green Dress, Surrounded by Exploding Clowns" in Words (March 2017).
- "In the Empire of Underpants" in Fiction River: No Humans Allowed (2017).
- "Count the Ways" in Heart's Kiss Issue 1 (2017).
- "The Greatest Serial Killer in the Universe" in At The Helm: Volume 2: A Sci-Fi Bridge Anthology (2017).
- "A Little Song, A Little Dance, A Little Apocalypse Down Your Pants" in Feast of Laughter Issue 4 (2017).
- "Playing Doctor" in At The Helm: Volume 3: A Sci-Fi Bridge Anthology (2017).
- "Underfoot" in Battletech: Legacy (2017).
- "Lost Luggage" in Heart's Kiss Issue 4 (2017).
- "The Breakout Story of Galaxy's Edge Issue Ten Million" in Galaxy's Edge Issue 28 (2017).
- "Piggyback" in Fiction River: Feel the Fear (2017).
- "A Spice Most Demanding" in Uncollected Anthology: Warlocks (2017).
- "Not-So-Fortunate Son" in Sins of the Father (2017).
- "The Sword That Spoke" in In the Lair: Volume 1: A Fantasy Bridge Anthology (2017).
- "Voyage of the Dog-Propelled Starship" in The Expanding Universe 3 (2017).
- "A Little Song, A Little Dance, A Little Apocalypse Down Your Pants" in Pulphouse Issue 0 (2017).
- "The Darks of Their Eyes" in Fiction River: Justice (2018).
- "Dirty Dreams of a Dishwasher" in Tales from the Canyons of the Damned Issue 22 (2018).
- "In the Empire of Underpants" in Pulphouse Issue 1 (2018).
- "The Stars So Black, The Space So White" in Galaxy's Edge Issue 31 (2018).
- "Identical" in Pulphouse Issue 2 (2018).
- "The Dancing Dead" in Modern Magic: An Urban Fantasy Anthology (2018).
- "Where No Furry Has Gone Before" in Boundary Shock Quarterly Issue 1 (2018).
- "Granted" in Fiction River: Wishes (2018).
- "Blackbeard's Aliens" in At The Helm: Volume 4: A Sci-Fi Bridge Anthology (2018).
- "Driverless" in Blood and Gasoline (2018).
- "Time Travel Among the Tasmanian Tigers of West Virginia" in Future Visions Volume 1 (2018).
- "Every Cloud Has A Silicon Lining" in Boundary Shock Quarterly Issue 2 (2018).
- "Robbing Them Double-Blind" in Boundary Shock Quarterly Issue 3 (2018).
- "Tempus Fugitive" in Timeshift: Tales of Time (2018).
- "The Merchant of Elves" in Uncollected Anthology: Fairy Tales (2018).
- "Time, Expressed as an Entrée" in Pulphouse Issue 3 (2018).
- "Death-Blind" in Fiction River: Pulse Pounders: Countdown (2018).
- "The Men Without Heads Join a Health Club" in Boundary Shock Quarterly Issue 4 (2018).
- "Trick or Treat in Hell" in Tales from the Canyons of the Damned Issue 28 (2018).
- "And The Unicorn You Rode In On" in Uncollected Anthology: Urban Western (2018).
- "Bigger Than the Monkey" in Pulphouse Issue 4 (2018).
- "Dreaming of a Carboniferous Christmas" in Tales from the Canyons of the Damned Issue 29 (2018).
- "The Man in the Sci Fi Suit" in Future Visions Volume 3 (2018).
- "The Little Robot's Bedtime Prayer" in The Best of Galaxy's Edge 2015–2017 (2018).
- "The Breakout Story of Galaxy's Edge Issue Ten Million" in The Best of Galaxy's Edge 2015–2017 (2018).
- "Sympathy for the Metal" in Boundary Shock Quarterly Issue 5 (2019).
- "With Love in Their Hearts" in Fiction River: Feel the Love (2019).
- "Offensive in Every Possible Way" in Pulphouse Issue 5 (2019).
- "Monsters of Ice Cream" in Uncollected Anthology: Beasties (2019).
- "The Juggernauts of El Dorado" in Thrilling Adventure Yarns (2019).
- "Bearers of Bad, Bad News" in Boundary Shock Quarterly Issue 7 (2019).
- "The Thousandth Atlas" in Pulphouse Issue 6 (2019).
- "The Listened Heart" in Uncollected Anthology: Silver Linings (2019).
- "An Infinite Number of Idiots" in Galaxy's Edge Issue 39 (2019).
- "The Asteroid That Stays Crunchy in Milk" in Boundary Shock Quarterly Issue 8 (2019).
- "Everyone Knows Humans Have Quintuple Wiggle Sticks" in Electric Athenaeum Issue 02 (2019).
- "A Choose Your Own Fangle Adventure" in Pulphouse Issue 7 (2019).
- "Show Me Yours" in Boundary Shock Quarterly Issue 10 (2020).
- "A Maze That Is A Great White Bull" in Uncollected Anthology: Mazes and Labyrinths (2020).
- "The Realm That Didn't Suck" in Fiction River: Doorways to Enchantment (2020).
- "A Murder of Clowns" in Fiction River: Stolen (2020).
- "The Makings of a Killer" in Black Cat Mystery Magazine #7: Special Private Eye Issue (2020).
- "Christmas Newsletters from the Edge" in Joyous Christmas (2020).
- "Ollie and the Designated Bitch" in Unexpected Heroines (Cutter's Final Cut Book 1) (2020).
- "Not Sick Enough in the Head" in Obsessions (2020).
- "The 1970s Must Die!" in Space: 1975 (2021).
- "Would Sir Prefer the 1918 Influenza?" in Pulphouse Issue 10 (2021).
- "From The Journal of Traumatic Warfighter Mutation" in Boundary Shock Quarterly Issue 14 (2021).
- "The Dragon with the Girl Tattoo" in Dragons (Cutter's Final Cut Book 2) (2021).
- "Dog and Pony Show" in Clarkesworld Issue 180 (2021).
- "Why You Should Think Twice Before Adopting an Alien Baby" in The Expanding Universe 7: An Intergalactic Adventure Anthology (2021).
- "And Miles to Go After I Sleep" in Kaleidotrope, Autumn 2021.
- "The X in Xmas" in Mystery Magazine, December 2021.
- "The Pooping Knight's Playbook" in WMG Holiday Spectacular 2021, December 2021.
- "The Christmas Haters' Ball" in WMG Holiday Spectacular 2021, December 2021.
- "Aye, Plank" in Uncollected Anthology: Paranormal Pirates (2022).
- "Pictures at a Hidden Exhibition" in Fiction River: Broken Dreams (2022).
- "The Dadaist's Tale: Start Making Sense" in The Fans Are Buried Tales (2022).
- "Chinese New Year's Resolution" in Alternative Holidays (2022).
- "Requiem for a Bird-Slinger" in Kaleidotrope, Autumn 2022.
- "Worth a Thousand Screams" in Tales from the Canyons of the Damned Issue 42, January 2023.
- "Faerieverse Unleashed!" in Uncollected Anthology: Faeries in Space (2023).
- "One Truffle Too Many" in Punk Noir Magazine, June 2023.
- "Untrustworthy" in No Secrets Better Kept (2023).
- "Secretary to a Serial Killer" in Yellow Mama (2023).
- "The Overdue Burrower" in Library Cases: Mystery, Crime, and Mayhem #15 (2023).
- "How to Save the Worlds Without a Proper Map" in Uncollected Anthology: Mystical Maps (2023).
- "Badass Candy" in Weird Fiction Quarterly, Fall & Halloween 2023.
- "Extinction Event Overdue" in Weird Fiction Quarterly, Fall & Halloween 2023.
- "A Decidedly Fly-by-Night Angel" in Candy Cane Kisses, November 2023.
- "What Happened Between Go-Days 15 and 16" in Time Travel Holidays, November 2023.
- "Not Just Another Saturnalia" in Winter Mysteries: Mystery, Crime, and Mayhem #16 (2023).
- "It's a Wonderful Death" in Pulphouse Issue 24 (2023).
- "The Luckiest Man in the World" in Black Cat Weekly Issue 121 (2023).
- "Read GOSSIP COLUMN CONFIDENTIAL by Henna Persimmon" in Litro Magazine USA, January 16, 2024.
- "Night of the Moto-Men" in Betrayal: Mystery, Crime, and Mayhem #17 (2024).
- "A Perfect Spot for Eyes Fishing" in Weird Fiction Quarterly - Monsters, 2024.
- "Kolchak: The Night Stalker: The Tomorrow Ghost" in Moonstone Triple Threat, 2024.
- "Captain Midnight: The Traitor of Midnight Mesa" in Moonstone Triple Threat, 2024.
- "Ear Worm" in Black Cat Weekly Issue 133 (2024).
- "Clashing Outfits" in Stupefying Stories Showcase Issue 133 (April 2, 2024).
- "The Zombie Rideshare" in Stolen Cars: Mystery, Crime, and Mayhem #18 (2024).
- "The Secret Language of Birds" in Minstrels in the Galaxy: Stories in the Key of Tull, Volume 1 (2024).
- "Garummy and the Queezle" in Weird Fiction Quarterly - Folk Horror, 2024.
- "Ode on a Grecian Burn" in Weird Fiction Quarterly - Summer 2024: Road Trip (2024).
- "Talk to the Ham (Sandwich)" in Cooking Up Crime: Mystery, Crime, and Mayhem #19 (2024).
- "Kitty on a Hot, Dying Star" in Pulphouse Issue 32 (2024).
- "An Imp in Spy's Clothing" in Black Cat Mystery Magazine #15 (2024).
- "Blue Laws" in Crimeucopia: Let Me Tell You About... (2024).
- "Death Rattle" in Remo Williams, The Destroyer: The Adventures Continue (2024).
- "Dead Gifted" in Black Cat Weekly Issue 172 (2024).
- "The Snow Shoveler" in Pulphouse Issue 36 (2024).
- "Bomb Humbug" in WMG Holiday Spectacular 2024, December 2024.
- "The Lamb Was Sure to Die" in Innocent Bystanders: Mystery, Crime, and Mayhem #21 (2025).
- "Green Hornet: Who Murdered the White Locust?" in Moonstone Double Shot, January 2025.
- "Make It Go Away" in Weird Fiction Quarterly - Winter 2025: Ghosts (2025).
- "How to Backmask Liner Notes" in Yellow Mama Issue 110 (2025).
- "Secret Menu Keep-Away" in Metastellar (May 8, 2025).
- "Ghost Station Zero" in Cold War Cthulhu, Drugstore Indian Press (May 2025).
- "The Cozy Hater" in Pulphouse Issue 39 (2025).
- "Dueling To-Do Lists: Joe Blow vs. Rinky-Dink the Poltergeist" in Dream Theory (June 2025).
- "The Color of the Echo of Malevolence" in Weird Fiction Quarterly: The King in Yellow 2025 (2025).
- "The Frog of War" in Worlds of IF Issue 179 (2025).
- "Deerly Undeparted" in Romance for All Seasons: Winter Warmth Issue 179 (2025).
- "One True Daddy's Gold Star Surprise" in Weird Fiction Quarterly: Artificial Intelligence (2026).
- "YesterNowMorrow and Other Myths" in Galaxy Issue 264 (2026).
- "We Only Live at Midnight" in Halloween Hearts (2026).
- "The Biggest Grudge of All" in Black Cat Weekly Issue 270 (2026).
- "The Picket Line Labradoodle" in Every Day Fiction (November 8, 2026).
- "The Patron Saint of Suicide" in Cthulhu Awakens (2026).

== Comic books ==
- "Young Soldiers Never Die" in War, Saddle Tramp Press (2004).
- "Shit's on First" in Commercial Suicide (U.K.) (2005).
- "Redneck Neighbor" in Dead by Dawn Quarterly (2006).
- "Unstoppable" in Justice Society of America 80-Page Giant 2010, Issue 1, DC Comics (2010).
- "Gotham Eye View" in Legends of the Dark Knight, Issue 52, DC Comics (2013).
- "Ghouligan's Island" in Fractured Scary Tales, Issue 3, Scary Tales Publishing (2017).
- "Little Haunted House on the Prairie" in Fractured Scary Tales, Issue 3, Scary Tales Publishing (2017).
- "V-Kings" in Fractured Scary Tales, Issue 3, Scary Tales Publishing (2017).
- "Godzil-la-la-land" in Fractured Scary Tales, Issue 4, Scary Tales Publishing (2017).
- "Keep Calm and Apocalypse On" (flash fiction) in Captain Ginger, Issue 2, Ahoy Comics (2018).
- "The Ups and Downs of Flying" (flash fiction) in The Wrong Earth, Issue 5, Ahoy Comics (2018).
- "The Day After They Rounded Up Everyone Who Could Love Unconditionally" (flash fiction) in Edgar Allan Poe's Snifter of Terror, Issue 5, Ahoy Comics (2019).
- "The Last Night of the Last Bokey-Bokey on Earth" (flash fiction) in Planet of the Nerds, Issue 1, Ahoy Comics (2019).
- "When We Get Done With Mr. Giraffe" (flash fiction) in Hashtag: Danger, Issue 2, Ahoy Comics (2019).
- "The Vampires Strike Back" in Fractured Scary Tales, Issue 6, Scary Tales Publishing (2019).
- "Revenge of the Yeti" in Fractured Scary Tales, Issue 6 Scary Tales Publishing (2019).
- "The Heavens Have Monsters Too" in Monster Smash-Ups, Issue 2, Scary Tales Publishing (2019).
- "Black Water" in Monster Smash-Ups, Issue 2, Scary Tales Publishing (2019).
- "Reenactment" in They're Heeere!, Issue 1, Scary Tales Publishing (2019).
- "God of a Different Roach" (flash fiction) in Edgar Allan Poe's Snifter of Terror, Season Two, Issue 3, Ahoy Comics (2019).
- "Eggs of the Dog That Bit You" (flash fiction) in Edgar Allan Poe's Snifter of Terror, Season Two, Issue 4, Ahoy Comics (2020).
- "The Maleficent Seven" in Fractured Scary Tales, Issue 7, Scary Tales Publishing (2020).
- "Goodzombies" in Fractured Scary Tales, Issue 7, Scary Tales Publishing (2020).
- "The Ravenous Mrs. Mayzel" in Fractured Scary Tales, Issue 7, Scary Tales Publishing (2020).
- "Last Will and Testament of a Pop-Up Store" (flash fiction) in Billionaire Island, Issue 3, Ahoy Comics (2020).
- "Surveying Mr. Nibbles" (flash fiction) in Ash & Thorn, Issue 5, Ahoy Comics (2020).
- "Hamlet with a Bomb Instead of a Poodle" (flash fiction) in The Wrong Earth: Night and Day, Issue 3, Ahoy Comics (2021).
- "Bon-Bon" in Edgar Allan Poe's Snifter of Blood, Issue 6, Ahoy Comics (2021).
- "When the Sandwich Comes for You" (flash fiction) in Edgar Allan Poe's Snifter of Blood, Issue 6, Ahoy Comics (2021).
- "My Uninvisible Friend" (flash fiction) in Black's Myth, Issue 2, Ahoy Comics (2021).
- "Twice Upon a Footnote" (flash fiction) in Snelson: Comedy Is Dying, Issue 5, Ahoy Comics (2021).
- "Return Your Rapture to the Upright Position" (flash fiction) in G.I.L.T., Issue 2, Ahoy Comics (2022).
- "Reviews of Museum-Goers by Famous Works of Art" (flash fiction) in Justice Warriors, Issue 2, Ahoy Comics (2022).
- "How Not to Operate a Victorian-Style Klodiopticon" (flash fiction) in The Gimmick, Issue 2, Ahoy Comics (2023).
- "Roy G. Biv and the Spectrum of Meh" (flash fiction) in Black's Myth: The Key to His Heart, Issue 2, Ahoy Comics (2023).
- "The Golden Goose Is the Elephant in the Room" (flash fiction) in Con & On, Issue 1, Ahoy Comics (2023).
- "Evelyn Is Everything" (flash fiction) in Con & On, Issue 3, Ahoy Comics (2023).
- "AIEEEEEEE!" (flash fiction) in The Wrong Earth: We Could Be Heroes, Issue 1, Ahoy Comics (2023).
- "Big Island Bigfoot" in They're Heeere! For Kids, Issue 2, Scary Tales Publishing (2024).
- "The Egg Masses of Unautumn Redux" (flash fiction) in Project: Cryptid, Issue 6, Ahoy Comics (2024).
- "The Super Hitman's Secret Power" in Tales from the Dispatch Volume 5, Snowyworks (2024).
- "Grief Is the New Crypto" (flash fiction) in Toxic Avenger Pinup Special, Issue 1, Ahoy Comics (2025).
- "The Age of Reason, 1794-2025" (flash fiction) in Toxic Avenger Comics, Issue 1, Ahoy Comics (2025).
- "Monsters vs. Martians: Bad Blood Part 1" in Monsters vs., Issue 2, Scary Tales Publishing (2024).
- "Monsters vs. Martians: Bad Blood Part 2" in Monsters vs., Issue 3, Scary Tales Publishing (2025).
- "Breakthrough of a Late Bloomer" (flash fiction) in Toxic Avenger, Issue 8, Ahoy Comics (2026).

== Podcast fiction ==
- "Fear of Rain" in PodCastle 007 (2008).
- "Snowman's Chance in Hell" in Drabblecast 167 (2010).
- "The Love Quest of Smidgen the Snack Cake" in Escape Pod 242 (2010).
- "Dionysus Dying" in Theme and Variations Opus 2 Episode 1 (2010).
- "Something Borrowed, Something Doomed" in Drabblecast 180 (2010).
- "The Bear in the Cable-Knit Sweater" in PodCastle 141 (2011).
- "A Matter of Size" in Drabblecast 195 (2010).
- "Playing Doctor" in Escape Pod 313 (2011).
- "The Spinach Can's Son" in StarShipSofa 323 (2014).
- "In A Green Dress, Surrounded By Exploding Clowns" in StarShipSofa 506 (2017).
- "A Little Song, A Little Dance, A Little Apocalypse Down Your Pants" in StarShipSofa 529 (2018).
- "Piggyback" in Tales to Terrify 361 (2018).
- "Trick or Treat in Hell" in Tales to Terrify 405 (2019).
- "An Infinite Number of Idiots" in StarShipSofa 626 (2020).

== Twitter serial ==
- Shave, in Thaumatrope (January 2010).

== Star Trek fiction ==
- "Whatever You Do, Don't Read This Story" in Star Trek: Strange New Worlds Volume III, Pocket Books (2000). (Third Prize Winner.)
- "The Shoulders of Giants" in Star Trek: Strange New Worlds Volume V, Pocket Books (2002).
- "Our Million-Year Mission" in Star Trek: Strange New Worlds Volume VI, Pocket Books (2003). (Grand Prize Winner.)
- "Oil and Water" in Star Trek: New Frontier: No Limits, Pocket Books (2003).
- "The Secret Heart of Zolaluz" in Star Trek: Voyager: Distant Shores, Pocket Books (2005).
- Star Trek: Starfleet Corps of Engineers: The Cleanup, E-book, Pocket Books (2006).
- Star Trek: Voyages of Imagination, Pocket Books (2006).
- "The Cleanup" in Star Trek: Corps of Engineers: Out of the Cocoon, Pocket Books (2010).

== Doctor Who ==
- "Rock Star" in Short Trips: The Quality of Leadership, Big Finish Productions (2008).

== Essays, articles, etc. ==
- "To Boldly Go Where No Comic Has Gone Before: Ten Of The Best Star Trek Comic Book Stories" in Amazing Heroes #181 (July 1990)
- "Here Come the Lower Deckers" in Star Trek Magazine #7 (Sept/Oct 2007)
- "Be Like House!" in House Unauthorized, Benbella Books (2007).
- "Time: The Final Frontier" in Star Trek Magazine #10 (Mar/Apr 2008)
- "Final Authority" in Star Trek Magazine #16 (Mar 2009)
- "Sympathy for the Devils" in In the Hunt: Unauthorized Essays on Supernatural, Benbella Books (2009).
- "Neelix & Kes" in Star Trek Magazine #32 (Mar 2011)
- "Fringe Double-Blinded Me With Science" in Fringe Science, Benbella Books (2011).
- "Star Trek: Enterprise Season 3" in Star Trek Magazine #37 (Oct/Nov 2011)
- "A Canvas as Big as a World" in Mars One, Humanity's Next Great Adventure, Benbella Books (2016).
- "Three Flew Over the Cuckoo's Nest" in Outside In Takes A Stab: 139 New Perspectives on 139 Buffy Stories by 139 Writers, ATB Publishing (2018)
- "Positively Biblical" in Somewhere Beyond the Heavens: Exploring Battlestar Galactica, Sequart Organization (2018)
- "Coming Attractions: Prescient Echoes of TV's Galactica Remake in Marvel's Comic Series" in Somewhere Beyond the Heavens: Exploring Battlestar Galactica, Sequart Organization (2018)
- "Jurassic Galactica: Colonials vs. Dinosaurs" in Somewhere Beyond the Heavens: Exploring Battlestar Galactica, Sequart Organization (2018)
- "Earth: Ninth Planet from the Sun - Mike Resnick Meets Galactica 1980" in Somewhere Beyond the Heavens: Exploring Battlestar Galactica, Sequart Organization (2018)
- "And Now, A Word from Our Sponsors" in Outside In Gains a Soul: 127 New Perspectives on 127 Angel and Firefly Stories by 127 Writers, ATB Publishing (2019)
- "Dirty, Dirty Hands: Touring the Underbelly of America with Azzarello" in From Bayou to Abyss: Examining John Constantine, Hellblazer, Sequart Organization (2020)
- "Hippie Freaks in Monstrous Clothing: The Addams Family vs. The Munsters" in Musings on Monsters: Observations on the World of Classic Horror, Sequart Organization (2020)
- "A Wolf in Sheep's Spacesuit: Nicholas Rush and the Dark Side of Stargate Universe" in Unauthorized Offworld Activation: Exploring the Stargate Franchise, Sequart Organization (2022)
- "Same Gate Time, Same Gate Channel: Resurrecting the Brand (Twice) with a Serial Flair" in Unauthorized Offworld Activation: Exploring the Stargate Franchise, Sequart Organization (2022)
- "May The Clones Be With You: Space Opera Copycats of a Galaxy Far, Far Away" in RetroFan Magazine #37, TwoMorrows Publishing (March 2025)
- "Who's Your Daddy...at Work?" in RetroFan Magazine #43, TwoMorrows Publishing (March 2026)
- "A Match Made in Heaven: Why Peak Match Game Kicks So Much Blank" in RetroFan Magazine #45, TwoMorrows Publishing (July 2026)
- "A Pucking Great Movie: 50 Years of Hilarious Hockey Hijinks with Slap Shot" in RetroFan Magazine #46, TwoMorrows Publishing (September 2026)
- "Flashback: Small Wonder: An Ode to Oberon: A True 'Jack' of All Trades" in Back Issue #169, TwoMorrows Publishing (September 2026)
- "Flashback: Leslie Thompkins: Angel of Crime Alley, Batman's Mother Figure" in Back Issue #170, TwoMorrows Publishing (October 2026)
- "Pop! Poof! Ping! Revisiting Moonshadow: A Conversation with J.M. DeMatteis and Jon J. Muth" in Back Issue #171, TwoMorrows Publishing (December 2026)

== Poetry ==
- "Incongruity" in American Collegiate Poets, International Publications (Fall 1984).
- "Lighthouse" in Backroads (Winter 1984).
- "Night School" in Backroads (Winter 1985).
- "Memoriam" in Backroads (Fall 1985).
- "Weight for Me(at)" in Backroads (Fall 1985).
- Flight of Ideas, (collection), Pie Press (2012).
- "I Love You More Than the Color Pink, Mirrorballface," in GUD: Greatest Uncommon Denominator Magazine (Spring 2016).
- "Murder by the Numbers," in Yellow Mama Issue 93 (2022).
- "I Wake After Seventy Years Instead of Seven," in Weird Fiction Quarterly: Masquerade 2024 (Fall 2024).
- "A Prayer for Johnstown Hockey," in The Bridge Lit Journal Issue 5 (Fall 2025).

== Theater ==
- Pure of Heart, one-act play (First staged March-April 2023, Off Pitt Street Theater Company).

== E-Books ==
- The Greatest Serial Killer in the Universe, Pie Press (2010). ISBN 978-1-452-31125-8
- Fear of Rain, Pie Press (2010). ISBN 978-1-452-31128-9
- Rose Head, Pie Press (2010). ISBN 978-1-452-35558-0
- My Cannibal Lover, Pie Press (2010). ISBN 978-1-452-31126-5
- The First Detect-Eve, Pie Press (2010). ISBN 978-1-452-31418-1
- The Love Quest of Smidgen the Snack Cake, Pie Press (2010). ISBN 978-1-452-39789-4
- Forced Retirement, Pie Press (2010). ISBN 978-1-452-39026-0
- Playing Doctor, Pie Press (2010). ISBN 978-1-452-37056-9
- Blazing Bodices, Pie Press (2010). ISBN 978-1-452-38758-1
- Serial Killer vs. E-Merica, Pie Press (2010). ISBN 978-1-452-36895-5
- Trek This!, Pie Press (2010). ISBN 978-1-452-35042-4
- Trek Off!, Pie Press (2010). ISBN 978-1-452-31929-2
- Trek Fail!, Pie Press (2010). ISBN 978-1-458-15990-8
- The Dolphin Knight, Pie Press (2010). ISBN 978-1-452-38592-1
- The Genie's Secret, Pie Press (2010). ISBN 978-1-452-33930-6
- Dick by Law, Pie Press (2010). ISBN 978-1-452-35964-9
- Bloodliner, Pie Press (2010). ISBN 978-1-452-36964-8
- Groupie Everlasting, Pie Press (2010). ISBN 978-1-452-33458-5
- Earthshaker, Pie Press (2010). ISBN 978-1-452-36944-0
- The Masked Family, Pie Press (2010). ISBN 978-1-452-31577-5
- Dionysus Dying, Pie Press (2010). ISBN 978-1-452-31874-5
- Six Fantasy Stories Volume 1, Pie Press (2010). ISBN 978-1-452-39123-6
- Six Scifi Stories Volume 1, Pie Press (2010). ISBN 978-1-452-38492-4
- Six Short Stories, Pie Press (2010). ISBN 978-1-452-37580-9
- Lump, Pie Press (2010). ISBN 978-1-458-02541-8
- Death by Polka, Pie Press (2010). ISBN 978-1-458-17095-8
- A Matter of Size, Pie Press (2011).
- Universal Language, Pie Press (2011). ISBN 978-1-458-10621-6
- Diary of a Maggot, Pie Press (2011). ISBN 978-1-458-01018-6
- Heroes of Global Warming, Pie Press (2011). ISBN 978-1-458-15127-8
- Tommy Puke and the Boy with the Golden Barf, Pie Press (2011). ISBN 978-1-458-04146-3
- One Awake In All The World, Pie Press (2011). ISBN 978-1-458-13810-1
- Give the Hippo What He Wants, Pie Press (2011). ISBN 978-1-458-16657-9
- The Teacher of the Century, Pie Press (2011). ISBN 978-1-458-06236-9
- The Return of Alice, Pie Press (2011). ISBN 978-1-458-16971-6
- Off the Face of the Earth, Pie Press (2011). ISBN 978-1-466-01900-3
- Road Rage, Pie Press (2011). ISBN 978-1-465-82469-1
- Something Borrowed, Something Doomed, Pie Press (2011). ISBN 978-1-465-89925-5
- Six Scifi Stories Volume 2, Pie Press (2011). ISBN 978-1-466-08629-6
- Girl Meets Mind Reader, Pie Press (2011). ISBN 978-1-465-99487-5
- The Sword That Spoke, Pie Press (2011). ISBN 978-1-465-87957-8
- Six Fantasy Stories Volume 2, Pie Press (2011). ISBN 978-1-465-96991-0
- Day 9, Pie Press (2011). ISBN 978-1-466-07961-8
- Seven Comic Book Scripts Volume 1, Pie Press (2011). ISBN 978-1-465-80431-0
- Backtracker, (as Jason Koenig), Pie Press (2011). ISBN 978-1-466-14402-6
- Crimes in the Key of Murder, Pie Press (2011). ISBN 978-1-466-03836-3
- Who Unkilled Johnny Murder? Pie Press (2011). ISBN 978-1-465-82319-9
- The Foolproof Cure for Cancer, Pie Press (2011). ISBN 978-1-465-86842-8
- Six Scifi Stories Volume 3, Pie Press (2011). ISBN 978-1-466-17240-1
- The Other Waiter, Pie Press (2011). ISBN 978-1-466-13371-6
- Six Crime Stories Volume 1, Pie Press (2011). ISBN 978-1-466-14689-1
- Getting Higher, Pie Press (2011). ISBN 978-1-465-72898-2
- The Shrooms of Benares, Pie Press (2011). ISBN 978-1-466-02200-3
- Star Sex, Pie Press (2011). ISBN 978-1-466-11641-2
- Messiah 2.0, Pie Press (2011).
- A Grain from a Balance: A Trek Screenplay, Pie Press (2011). ISBN 978-1-465-77560-3
- Vendetta: A Trek Screenplay, Pie Press (2011). ISBN 978-1-465-75677-0
- Sticks and Stones, A Trek Novel, Pie Press (2011). ISBN 978-1-465-90413-3
- Trek You!, Pie Press (2011). ISBN 978-1-466-04948-2
- Trek It!, Pie Press (2011). ISBN 978-1-465-80115-9
- Tommy Puke and the World's Grossest Grown-Up, Pie Press (2011). ISBN 978-1-466-06556-7
- Lenin of the Stars, Pie Press (2012). ISBN 978-1-465-70014-8
- Forced Betrayal, Pie Press (2012). ISBN 978-1-465-79466-6
- Beware the Black Battlenaut, Pie Press (2012). ISBN 978-1-465-77668-6
- Flight of Ideas, Pie Press (2012). ISBN 978-1-466-19753-4
- Forced Partnership, Pie Press (2012). ISBN 978-1-465-71312-4
- The Wife Who Never Was, Pie Press (2012). ISBN 978-1-476-06127-6
- Seven Comic Book Scripts Volume 2, Pie Press (2012). ISBN 978-1-476-43652-4
- Six Superhero Stories, Pie Press (2012). ISBN 978-1-476-39998-0
- Mr. Sandman: The Dream Lord Awakens, Pie Press (2012). ISBN 978-1-301-90081-7
- Heaven Bent, A Novel, Pie Press (2012). ISBN 978-1-301-50488-6
- Snowman's Chance in Hell, Pie Press (2012). ISBN 978-1-301-04685-0
- The Bear in the Cable-Knit Sweater, Pie Press (2012). ISBN 978-1-301991594
- Scifi Motherlode, Pie Press (2012). ISBN 978-1-301-27752-0
- Seven Comic Book Scripts Volume 3, Pie Press (2013). ISBN 978-1-301-93841-4
- Warning! Do Not Read This Story! Pie Press (2012). ISBN 978-1-301-09891-0
- Tijuana, Massachusetts, Pie Press (2013). ISBN 978-1-301-12144-1
- The Secret of the Ultimate Male Enhancement, Pie Press (2013). ISBN 978-1-301-32041-7
- A Pinstriped Finger's My Only Friend, Pie Press (2013). ISBN 978-1-301-64848-1
- Luminaria, Pie Press (2013). ISBN 978-1-301-52273-6
- The Memory of You Lingers, Pie Press (2013). ISBN 978-1-301-77160-8
- Undercrowd, Pie Press (2013).
- The Slaughterers, Pie Press (2013). ISBN 978-1-311-40991-1
- Daddy's Little Girl, Pie Press (2013). ISBN 978-1-310-62592-3
- The Walking Bomb, Pie Press (2013). ISBN 978-1-310-15665-6
- Christmas at Glosser's, Pie Press (2013). ISBN 978-1-310-46307-5
- Six Scifi Stories Volume Four, Pie Press (2014). ISBN 978-1-311-18764-2
- The Spinach Can's Son, Pie Press (2014). ISBN 978-1-310-94918-0
- Cock-a-Doodle Die, Pie Press (2014). ISBN 978-1-310-04375-8
- Long Live Glosser's, Pie Press (2014). ISBN 978-0-692-32284-0
- Easter at Glosser's, Pie Press (2015). ISBN 978-1-311-38681-6
- Comic Book Motherlode, Pie Press (2015). ISBN 978-1-370-68448-9
- The Dancing Dead, Pie Press (2015). ISBN 978-1-370-12456-5
- The Messiah Business, Pie Press (2016). ISBN 978-1-370-34380-5
- Monkey Sea, Monkey Do, Pie Press (2017). ISBN 978-0-463-61057-2
