= Jennifer Brozek =

American writer (born 1970)

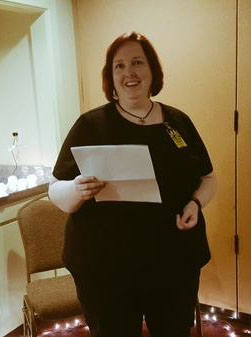
- Brozek at Crypticon, May 2015
- Born: Jennifer Lynn Brozek; December 9, 1970 (age 55); Elmendorf Air Force Base, Anchorage, Alaska, U.S.
- Occupation: Freelance writer
- Writing career
- Period: 2004–present
- Genres: Fantasy, role-playing game, horror, science fiction
- Website: www.jenniferbrozek.com

Jennifer Brozek (born December 9, 1970) is an American freelance author, game design writer, editor, and small press publisher.

== Career ==
Before becoming a full-time writer, Brozek was a software QA engineer working on a wide range of projects, including video games. Brozek co-chaired one of the first Babylon 5 science fiction conventions (StarQuest '95). She was the basis for a main character in the webcomic Casey and Andy by Andy Weir, named Jenn Brozek, who is listed as a 200-point GURPS character in the role-playing game GURPS Casey and Andy.

Brozek began her professional writing career in 2004. She was the editor-in-chief of the semiprozine, The Edge of Propinquity, a webzine that published for six years, and worked as an assistant editor, sounding board, and convention volunteer for the Apex Book Company. Brozek is now the creative director of Apocalypse Ink Productions and a member of International Association of Media Tie-in Writers (IAMTW), the Horror Writers Association, and the Science Fiction and Fantasy Writers of America (SFWA). She served as SFWA Director-at-Large from 2015 to 2017.

Brozek's work in fiction and editing has won and been nominated for several awards, such as the Bram Stoker Award, British Fantasy Award, Scribe Award, ENnie, Origins Award, and Hugo.

== Personal life ==
Brozek has stated that she has Asperger syndrome and dyslexia, and has also experienced a stutter and bouts of anxiety.

== Books ==
=== Fiction ===
2024

- Shadowrun: Auditions (A Mosaic Run Collection), February 2024

2023

- Shadowrun: The Kilimanjaro Run, A YA Novella, Catalyst Game Labs, September 2023
- Tears of Perseus omnibus, Shadow Alley Press, May 2023
- Never Let Me, YA SF-Thriller trilogy omnibus, re-release, April 2023

2022

- Shadowrun: Unrepairable, A YA Novella Catalyst Game Labs, December 2022
- Truumeel's Light Part 1 of Tear of Perseus, Shadow Alley Press, November 2022
- Shadowrun: Elfin Black, A Novel, Catalyst Game Labs, March 2022
- The Last Days of Salton Academy A YA Zombie Novel, re-release, March 2022

2021

- Battletech: Crimson Night, Rogue Academy #3, A YA Novel, Catalyst Game Labs, July 2021
- Shadowrun: See How She Runs, A YA Novella, Catalyst Game Labs, April 2021

2020

- BattleTech: Ghost Hour, Rogue Academy #2, June 2020
- Shadowrun: A Kiss to Die For, June 2020

2019

- Makeda Red, Shadowrun novel - Catalyst Game Labs, July 2019
- BattleTech: Iron Dawn, Rogue Academy #1 - Catalyst Game Labs, April 2019
- A Secret Guide to Fighting Elder Gods (editor) - Pulse Publishing, April 2019

2018

- To Fight the Black Wind, Arkham Horror novella - Fantasy Flight Games, April 2018
- A is for Apex, ABC Book for Your Little Mad Scientist - Apocalypse Ink Productions, August 2018
- The Prince of Artemis V, All-ges science-fantasy comic book - Apocalypse Ink Productions, February 2018

2017

- Five Minute Stories, flash fiction collection - Apocalypse Ink Productions, September 2017

2016

- The Last Days of Salton Academy, novel - Ragnarok Productions, October 2016
- Colonial Gothic: Lost Tales collection - Rogue Games, April 2016
- Karen Wilson Chronicles, omnibus of the Karen Wilson Chronicles Series - Apocalypse Ink Productions, March 2016
- Never Let Me, omnibus of the Melissa Allen series - Permuted Press, January 2016

2015

- Never Let Me Die, Book 3 of the Melissa Allen series - Permuted Press, December 2015
- Never Let Me Leave, Book 2 of the Melissa Allen series - Permuted Press, November 2015
- Chimera Incarnate: Book Four of the Karen Wilson Chronicles, novel - Apocalypse Ink Productions, March 2015
- DocWagon 19, Shadowrun novella - Catalyst Game Labs, March 2015
- Never Let Me Sleep, Book 1 of the Melissa Allen series, young adult SF-thriller novel - Permuted Press, TBA 2015
- The Last Days of Salton Academy - Ragnarok Publications, TBA

2014

- The Nellus Academy Incident, YA BattleTech novel - Catalyst Game Labs, January 2014
- Keystones: Book Three of the Karen Wilson Chronicles, novel - Apocalypse Ink Productions, April 2014

2013

- Children of Anu: Book Two of the Karen Wilson Chronicles, mosaic novel - Apocalypse Ink Productions, June 2013

2012

- The Lady of Seeking in the City of Waiting, Shadeside novella - Dark Quest Books, February 2012
- Caller Unknown: Book One of the Karen Wilson Chronicles , mosaic novel - Apocalypse Ink Productions, November 2012

2011

- Shanghai Vampocalypse hard copy - Savage Mojo, Author, August 2011

2010

- In a Gilded Light: 105 Tales of the Macabre, Dark Quest Books, 2010

=== Nonfiction ===
- The Little Finance Book That Could, Book Shaker, 2010 ISBN 1-907498-33-8
- Industry Talk: An Insider's Look at Writing RPGs and Editing Anthologies, Apocalypse Ink Productions, 2012 ISBN 0985532319

== Awards and nominations ==
Awards for Brozek's writing
Year	Title	Award	Result	Ref.
2009	Grants Pass	Australian Shadows Award for Best Edited Publication	Winner	
2013	“Locks and Keys”	Scribe Award for Best Short Story Tie-In	Finalist	
2015		Hugo Award for Best Professional Editor, Short Form	Finalist	
2015	Chicks Dig Gaming	ENNIE Award for Best Related Product	Finalist	
2015	BattleTech: The Nellus Academy Incident	Scribe Award for Best Young Adult Tie-in Novel	Winner	
2015	Never Let Me Sleep	Bram Stoker Award for Best Young Adult Novel	Finalist	
2015	“Written in the Wind”	Scribe Award for Best Short Story Tie-In	Finalist	
2016	The Last Days of Salton Academy	Bram Stoker Award for Best Young Adult Novel	Finalist	
2016	"To Lose the Stars"	Jim Baen Memorial Award	Runner-Up	
2019		Rainforest Writers Inspirational Award	Winner	
2019		Raven Award for Horror/Thriller Novel	Finalist	
2019	A Secret Guide to Fighting Elder Gods	Bram Stoker Award for Best Anthology	Finalist	
2019	A Secret Guide to Fighting Elder Gods	British Fantasy Award for Anthology	Finalist	
2019	BattleTech: Iron Dawn	Scribe Award for Best Young Adult Tie-in Novel	Finalist	
2022	Battletech: Crimson Night	Scribe award for Original & Adapted Novels: Young Adult / Middle Grade	Finalist	
2024	Shadowrun: Auditions	Scribe Award for Best YA/MG Tie-in Novel	Winner	
2024	“Valdemar: Needs Must When Evil Bides”	Scribe Award for Best Short Story	Finalist	
2025		Hugo Award for Best Professional Editor, Short Form	Finalist	
2026		Hugo Award for Best Professional Editor, Short Form	Finalist	
