= Critter Crunch (robotics competition) =

- Status: Active
- Genre: Robotics competition
- Frequency: Annually
- Venue: MileHiCon
- Locations: Denver, Colorado
- Country: USA
- Established: 1987; 39 years ago
- Sponsor: Denver Mad Scientists Club

The Critter Crunch is a combat robot competition that takes place annually at the MileHiCon science fiction convention. With the first event held in 1989, (Note: Sources disagree over the start date of the Critter Crunch. 1986 and 1987 have also been claimed as the year of the first Critter Crunch event)it has been credited as the first robot combat competition.

== History ==
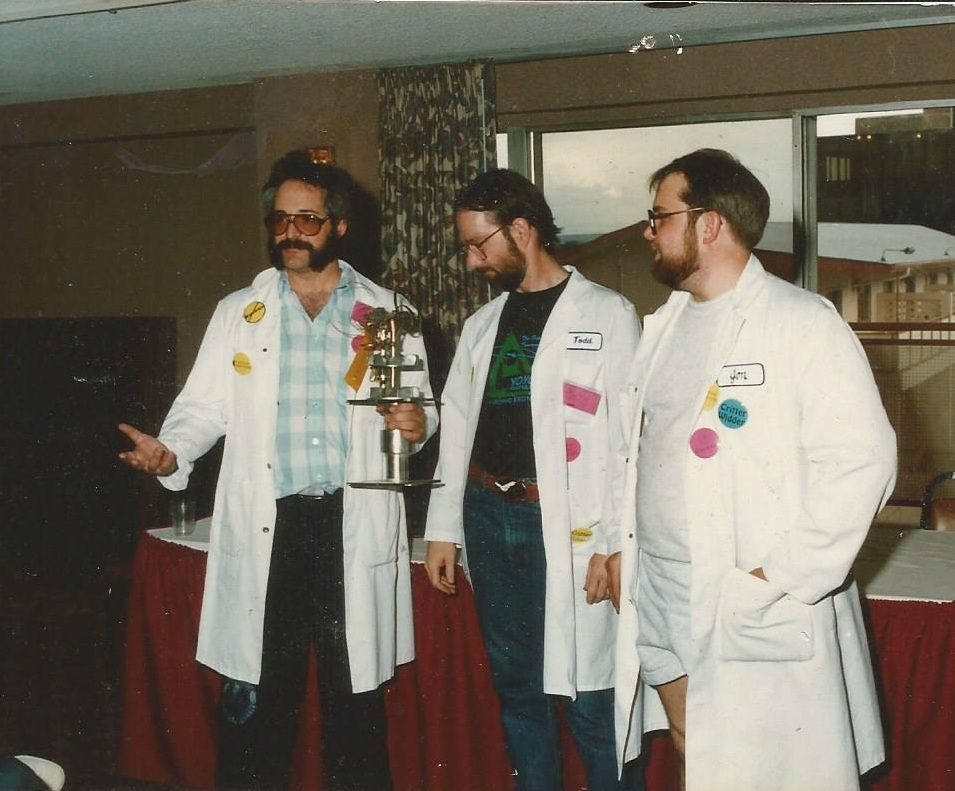
Winners of the 1991 Critter Crunch. Left to right: Claude Warren, Todd Hill, and Jon Wood.

The competition was proposed by the Denver Mad Scientists Club and organized by member Bill Llewellin. Prior to the first Critter Crunch event, the club produced a set of rules which were distributed without copyright restriction, allowing other organizations to use or extend them for their own competitions.

The first competition was held on a hotel table. The original rules prohibited damaging the surface. There were several competitors, including a remote control dune buggy, a mechanical device under a steel mixing bowl, and a little yellow remote control Corvette that could only go forward or backwards and turn. The first competition was won by the Corvette.

The second Critter Crunch event was competed in by "five or 10" competitors. These included "Fluffy Bunny", built by Bill Llewellin, armed with a forklift, and "Big Punch", built by Bill Lemieux and Mike Bakula, armed with a Pneumatic spike. The winner of this Critter Crunch was "Thing One" built by Pat Thompson, armed with a can of silly string.

In 2020, Milehicon announced the Critter Crunch would not be held that year due to the global pandemic.
