= Robert T. Jeschonek =

American writer

- Education: University of Pittsburgh at Johnstown
- Writing career
- Period: Modern
- Website: www.robertjeschonek.com

Robert T. Jeschonek is an American writer. He writes fiction in a range of genres including fantasy, humor, mystery, science fiction, and superheroes.

== Career ==
His novel, My Favorite Band Does Not Exist won first place in the Teen/Young Adult category of the 2012 Forward National Literature Awards. His science fiction thriller, Day 9, won first place in the Fiction: Cross-Genre category of the 2013 International Book Awards.

Jeschonek's credits include Star Trek fiction published by Pocket Books and Doctor Who fiction from Big Finish. Jeschonek's work appeared in three volumes of Star Trek: Strange New Worlds, winning the grand prize in Volume VI. He has been invited to write stories in Peter David's Star Trek: New Frontier universe. His story, "Oil and Water," appeared in Star Trek: New Frontier: No Limits.

Jeschonek is based in Johnstown, Pennsylvania and attended the University of Pittsburgh at Johnstown.

Jeschonek was also part of the group that published Flood City Comics in the mid-1980s. Jeschonek edited four of the five issues and contributed stories including "Johnstown Man" (a local superhero) and "Chow World" (adventures on a planet of talking food).

His novel Rising Sun, Falling Shadows, set in the world of Tannhäuser won a Scribe Award in 2013.

== See also ==
- Robert T. Jeschonek bibliography
