= Tracey West =

American writer

Tracey West is a prolific American children's book author. She has written for many different licensed series, including Pokémon, and writes the popular, original series Dragon Masters. A Scribe award-winner, she has also been a nominee and finalist for multiple children's book awards. West also run The Dragon Wagon, a mobile bookstore that sells and gives away books to children in upstate New York.

== Career ==
West is an American author of over 400 children's books. She has written for numerous book series, including Pokémon, Teen Titans, and The Powerpuff Girls. She is also the author of the original children's fantasy series Pixie Tricks and Dragon Masters.

In 2023, West founded The Dragon Wagon, a mobile children's bookstore inside a converted school bus. During the summers, West and Hancock drive The Dragon Wagon throughout the Catskills, selling and giving away books. West stated that the rise in book banning motivated her to start The Dragon Wagon.

=== Awards ===
West is a two-time nominee (2017, 2024) for the Otter awards, a children's book contest sponsored by the School Libraries Division of the Washington Library Association. She has earned multiple Scribe award nominations and won the 2009 best adapted novel (Young Adult category) for her novelization of Journey To The Center Of The Earth 3D. Her Temple Run was a finalist in the 2015 Children's Choice Book Awards.

=== Reception ===
In 2022, a Dragon Masters book drew a small amount of conservative criticism for introducing Val, a character using they/them pronouns. West's emphasis on inclusion and empathy, among other features, also led a Catskills newspaper columnist to argue West deserved the title "Person of the Year."

== Personal Life ==
Tracey West lives in New York state. She is married to Bill Hancock.
