= Cyberpunk (collectible card game) =

Cyberpunk CCG
- Two Cyberpunk cards, "Trashin' the Corp Zone" and "A.V. 1"
- Designers: Peter J. Wacks
- Publishers: Social Games
- Players: 2 or more
- Setup time: < 2 minutes
- Playing time: ca. 30 minutes
- Chance: Some
- Skills: Card playing Arithmetic

Cyberpunk: The Collectible Card Game, also known as Cyberpunk CCG and Cyberpunk, the CCG, is an out-of-print collectible card game designed by Peter J. Wacks, based on R. Talsorian Games' dystopian near-future role-playing game Cyberpunk 2020.

== Publication history ==
Cyberpunk CCG was designed by Peter J. Wacks, using the Cyberpunk 2020 RPG setting licensed from R. Talsorian. Wacks claimed that "The CCG is built to play pretty much exactly like the RPG."

The "2013 Edition" (set in the year 2013) was released in December 2003 as a limited edition. Two months later, in February, 2004, the "2020 Edition" (set in the year 2020) was released.

== Setting ==
The world of Cyberpunk 2020 presents a darker vision of the near future, inspired by cyberpunk writers like William Gibson, Bruce Sterling, and Neal Stephenson, and movies such as Blade Runner, Johnny Mnemonic and The Matrix.

== Gameplay ==
The main goal of Cyberpunk CCG is to achieve victory by accumulating the so-called Ops points, either by accomplishing missions or 'busting' (destroying) the opponent's location cards. Additionally, each player is required to use a 'Sponsor card' throughout the game. Each of these cards supplies a new victory condition, depending on the premise of the sponsor. Another principal idea used in the game is that cards have their style factor. A player can also attempt victory by accumulating style. Characters have their style attribute which is then modified by the equipment and cybernetics they bear.

== Card types ==
=== Sponsor cards ===
Limited to one per deck and played at the beginning of the game. They provide a specific game text and a victory condition.

1. Biotechnica - cybernetics-oriented; provides the possibility of victory through Empathy loss.
2. Cops - provides the possibility of victory through busting runners.
3. Militech - combat-oriented; provides the possibility of victory through controlling offense.
4. Nomads - provides the possibility of victory through controlling vehicles and The Open Road location card.
5. The Mob - provides the possibility of victory through controlling locations.
6. Your Friendly Local Gangs - provides the possibility of victory through the completion of a Punknaught (a custom-built vehicle consisting of several other vehicles and heavy weaponry) and raiding the corporate zone (with the use of a special card entitled Thrashing the Corp Zone).
7. Arasaka - combat-oriented; provides the possibility of victory through controlling defense. It only was printed in the Your First Run demo deck.

=== Runners ===
Runners are the characters of Cyberpunk CCG. They are deployed by 'buying their loyalty' in Euro Bucks. Each character has his or her profession or role similar to those seen in the role-playing game (that is Solo, Netrunner, Nomad, Tech, etc.). Each role has its own set of rules and abilities that are explained in the manual apart from their regular game text.

=== Equipment cards ===
Equipment cards represent all usable items like vehicles, weapons and gadgets.

=== Cybernetics ===
Cybernetics represent one of the basic concepts in cyberpunk visions of the future, i.e. cybernetic modifications of the body. They are responsible for Empathy loss, representing loss of humanity in favour of the machine. Similarly to Cyberpunk 2020 role-playing game, a character whose Empathy breaks 0 becomes a cyber-psycho.

=== Missions ===
Mission cards are an indispensable element as, when completed, they give Ops points, which are necessary for victory.

=== Locations ===
Location cards most often serve as resource for deploying other cards. They usually have a resource value in Euro Bucks printed on them and by means of 'using' them (tapping the cards) the resource is spent. They represent common locations like snack bars and hotels as well as high-security government locations. They are also necessary for victory, as each player may decide to raid any of the opponents locations thus depriving them of the resource provided and gaining Ops points.

=== Event cards ===
Event cards represent all other situations not connected with abovementioned card types. They are playable any time and may have a significant influence on the course of the game.

== Reception ==
In 2004, Game Monkeys Magazine found the rules "a bit unclear and complicated at first, [but] once you start playing the game it becomes clear and fluid." The rulebook itself was "a bit hard to read, and the small type doesn't make things any easier, but when you finally get going you really feel as if you're playing a RPG in CCG form." The artwork was given a rating of 4 out of 5 because "The look of this game is very unique and it does have a style that reflects the Cyberpunk universe." Value vs Cost was likewise rated 4 out of 5, since "Getting started for reasonable play won't set you back too much." Overall, the game was highly recommended, and given an excellent rating of 5 out of 5.
