= John Passarella =

American author

John "Jack" Passarella is an American author. His work includes a number of novels set in Joss Whedon's Buffyverse.

== Bibliography ==
=== Buffyverse ===
Media tie-in novels relating to the fictional universe established by Buffy and Angel:

- 2000 Ghoul Trouble
- 2001 Avatar
- 2004 Monolith

=== Supernatural ===
Media tie-in novels relating to the fictional universe established by Supernatural.

- 2011 Night Terror
- 2012 Rite of Passage
- 2016 Cold Fire

=== Other works ===
- 1999 Wither (hardcover)
- 2000 Wither (paperback)
- 2003 Wither's Rain
- 2004 Wither's Legacy
- 2006 Kindred Spirit
- 2009 Shimmer
- 2018 Halloween: The Official Movie Novelization
- 2026 Return to Silent Hill: The Official Movie Novelization

== Biography ==
Passarella is a married father of three young children, who all reside in Logan Township, New Jersey. Currently, "Jack" writes full-time when he's not working on his website design and author promotion business AuthorPromo.com. While he enjoys writing in the genres of dark fantasy, supernatural thrillers, horror, science fiction, fantasy and mystery, he has been concentrating on horror and supernatural stories in recent years.

Wither, co-authored with Joseph Gangemi, was his first published novel. Columbia Pictures purchased the film rights to Wither in a preemptive, pre-publication bid. In 2000, Wither won the Bram Stoker Award for Superior Achievement in a First Novel. Passarella followed Wither with the media tie-ins Buffy the Vampire Slayer: Ghoul Trouble and Angel: Avatar. Next came his stand-alone sequel to Wither, Wither's Rain.

The author had two novels published in 2004, Angel: Monolith and Wither's Legacy. Next up is Kindred Spirit in June 2006.

Passarella is an active member of the Horror Writers Association and the Science Fiction and Fantasy Writers of America, a regular member of the Authors Guild, and a member of the Garden State Horror Writers.

Since June 1996, he has been writing articles on Microsoft Word and other soft & hard areas of the computer world for WindoWatch, a free webzine.

A former Treasurer of the Horror Writers Association, and a current mentor, he is also the webmaster for the Garden State Horror Writers.
