= Guy Anthony De Marco =

American novelist (born 1963)

- Born: 1963 (age 62–63); New York, U.S.
- Occupation: Author
- Spouse: Tonya De Marco
- Children: 3
- Writing career
- Language: English
- Genres: Speculative, horror, science fiction, fantasy, steampunk, paranormal
- Notable awards: HWA Bram Stoker Award® and IAMTW Scribe Award finalist, HWA Silver Hammer Award winner, E2 Fin de Siecle
- Website: guyanthonydemarco.com

Guy Anthony De Marco (born 1963) is an American author, musician, programmer and teacher.

== Biography and work ==
De Marco writes speculative fiction, including the horror, science fiction, fantasy, steampunk and paranormal genres.

He is best known for his short fiction. Stories of note include:

- "My Muse is Dead", of which OG's Speculative Fiction said, "They say there is a very thin line between ordinary and creative. It’s just a matter of how you look at things. A great piece of writing."
- "Steaks", Every Day Fiction's most-read story of January 2009, which led to an interview on their website His story is included in their anthology, Every Day Fiction Two.
- "Sands", which won the Great E2 Fin de Siecle Fiction Challenge in Sept 2001. The judge noted, "What can I say? Great plot, great use of words, EVIL puns, appalling cheating. I laughed and I loved it."
- "Exploring", a dwarf-form poem, which was a finalist for the Science Fiction Poetry Association's 2012 annual contest

De Marco was awarded the Horror Writers Association's Silver Hammer Award for service to the organization in 2011. This was presented at the 2012 World Horror Convention in Salt Lake City, Utah.

His graphic novel Behind These Eyes, co-written with Peter J. Wacks, was a finalist for the 2012 Bram Stoker Awards.

De Marco co-wrote a cyberpunk novel based on the Interface Zero 2.0 game world with Peter J. Wacks and Josh Vogt called Solar Singularity, which was selected as a finalist for the juried International Association of Media Tie-in Writers annual Scribe award for 2018.

De Marco had previously worked as one of the writers on the core rule book for Interface Zero 2.0: Full Metal Cyberpunk RPG game which was itself a finalist for the 2015 ENnie Award in the original interior art category.

De Marco served in voluntary positions in the Horror Writers Association, including the Web Team, where he was in charge of setting up new users for the HWA's website, and spent two years as the HWA Chapters Chairman.

De Marco attends multiple conventions every year, including the World Horror Convention, GalaxyFest, ArchonSTL, COSine, Starfest, Salt Lake Comic Con, and MileHiCon. He has participated on discussion panels with topics such as "Writing Strong Women in Speculative Fiction", "Zombies", "Are Zombies the New Black?", "NaNoWriMo for Beginners", "The Horror of HP Lovecraft", "E-Books for Beginners", "Niche Writing", "What is SteamPunk?", and "What Is Horror?". His current panel record for one convention (19) was set at AnomalyCon 2013 in Denver, Colorado.

An avid drummer, he played in several New York bands including Prickley Heat and Raw Sewage, which received radio airtime on college radio stations in upstate New York. In 2020, De Marco was listed as an associate producer of the horror film Next Door on IMDb.

De Marco is a member of the American Society of Composers, Authors and Publishers, the Science Fiction and Fantasy Writers of America, the International Association of Media Tie-in Writers, Western Writers of America, the Horror Writers Association, the Science Fiction Poetry Association, the Missouri Writers Guild, the International Order of Horror Professionals, Rocky Mountain Fiction Writers, Northern Colorado Writers, and the American Society of Composers, Authors and Publishers.

He currently resides in the midwestern United States with his wife, Tonya.

== Selected bibliography ==
=== Books ===
- (2012) Cisco UCS Deployment Guide, Pine Bluffs Press
- (2012) The Bride, Yurei Press, LLC, Nov 2012
- (2012) Odd Places, Yurei Press, LLC, ISBN 9781622250196
- (2013) The Dynasty Sentinel, TPC, LLC
- (2013) QR Codes for Authors, from The Authors Handbook series, ASIN B009BD6MQI, Pine Bluffs Press
- (2013) Convention Panels, from The Authors Handbook series, ASIN TBD, Pine Bluffs Press
- (2013) Tales from the Fleet: Stories and Essays from the US Navy, ASIN TBD, Villainous Press
- (2013) Fury Within, Yurei Press, LLC
- (2017) Solar Singularity - an Interface Zero 2.0 Novel, WordFire Press

=== Short stories ===
- (1979) "Vork", New New York Tales
- (1980) "Sallie the Baker", Adirondack Stories
- (1991) "Treasures", Regional Ghost Stories
- (2001) "Sands", The Great E2 Fin de Siecle Challenge contest, 1st-place winner
- (2007) "Streetwalker", Serpentarius Magazine
- (2007) "Beat a Retreat", Tiny Lights
- (2007) "The Mobius Stripper", 6S
- (2008) "Home", Necrotic Tissue issue 1
- (2008) "Troubles", Necrotic Tissue issue 2
- (2008) "Journey", Literary Fever
- (2008) "Vultures", AlienSkin Magazine
- (2008) "Angelic", Yellow Mama
- (2009) "Steaks", Every Day Fiction
- (2009) "Death Grip", Necrotic Tissue issue 7, ISBN 9780982496909
- (2010) "Member of the Herd", Every Day Fiction
- (2012) "Vultures", MicroHorror
- (2012) "Jack and Jill", FairyPunk Stories
- (2012) "A Case of Curiosities", Daily Science Fiction
- (2013) "Twinkle, Twinkle, Little Star", FairyPunk Stories
- (2013) "The Wonderful Derby Race", FairyPunk Stories
- (2013) "Smeerf Hunting", Lorelei Signal, Carol Hightshoe, editor

=== Collections and anthologies ===
- (2008) The Help Anthology, featuring the short story "Dead Meat"
- (2007) Absolute Truths and Outright Lies, ISBN 9781424339228 (out of print)
- (2010) Every Day Fiction Two, ISBN 9780981058429; featuring the short story "Steaks"
- (2010) Daily Bites of Flesh 2011, ISBN 9781617060182; featuring the short story "Steaks"
- (2010) Daily Bites of Flesh 2011, ISBN 9781617060182; featuring the short story "Monsters"
- (2011) Absolute Truths and Outright Lies, collection, Yurei Press, LLC; ASIN: B006NV4GEQ; ISBN 9781622250011
- (2012) GalaxyFest Omnibus limited edition, 1st Ed, ISBN 9781470088958; featuring the short story "The Prize"
- (2013) Fifty Shades of Decay, ISBN 9781482580846; featuring the opening story "Rabbits"
- (2013) Ancient Terrors, ISBN 9781622250080; editor
- (2013) Five Frightful Tales, contributor
- (2013) Barnyard Horror, James Ward Kirk Publishing

=== Nonfiction articles ===
- (2000) "Newbie Unix PW-LS", Attrition.org
- (2002) "IP Addressing Primer", F. R. Press
- (2007) "My Muse is Dead", OG's Speculative Fiction
- (2008) "Understanding Accents", Visions Mag issue 43
- (2008) "Sonor2: Tracking Those Subs", Visions Mag issue 44
- (2010) "Using Google Alerts", Horror Writers Association Newsletter Feb 2011 issue
- (2010) "Hiding Description", Writers' Journal, May/June issue
- (2012) "Sailing on Digital Seas: Rescuing Pirated Stories", Horror Writers Association Newsletter March 2012 issue and blog
- (2012) "Understanding Accents", Dark Edifice Magazine
- (2012) "Sailing on Digital Seas: Hunting for Pirates", Horror Writers Association Newsletter April 2012 issue
- (2012) "Sailing on Digital Seas: Advanced Google-fu", Horror Writers Association Newsletter May 2012 issue
- (2012) "Sailing on Digital Seas: Researching Publishers", Horror Writers Association Newsletter June 2012 issue
- (2012) "Sailing on Digital Seas: Facebook for Authors", Horror Writers Association Newsletter July 2012 issue

=== Interviews ===
- (2009) Every Day Fiction
- (2010) Choate Road WITI

=== Graphics ===
- (2008) "Regional Map for the SFWA", Science Fiction and Fantasy Writers of America (SFWA)'s New Members Handbook

=== Music and lyrics ===
- (1983) "The Dead Rose", co-written with R. Backus, J. Decker, C. Ferriss, K. Denton (ASCAP)
- (1983) "Nuke the Whales", co-written with R. Backus, J. Decker, C. Ferriss, K. Denton (ASCAP)
- (1984) "In Concert Special", co-written with R. Backus, J. Decker, C. Ferriss, K. Denton (ASCAP)
- (1984) "Lucky", co-written with R. Backus, J. Decker, C. Ferriss, K. Denton (ASCAP)
- (1984) "Thunder Thighs", co-written with R. Backus, J. Decker, C. Ferriss, K. Denton (ASCAP)
- (1984) "The Thorn", co-written with R. Backus, J. Decker, C. Ferriss, K. Denton (ASCAP)
- (1984) "Lucky Jam Like We Drunk", co-written with R. Backus, J. Decker, C. Ferriss, K. Denton (ASCAP)
- (1991) "Gamma Adjust" (ASCAP)
- (1991) "Alpha With a Twist" (ASCAP)
- (1991) "Beta Ballad" (ASCAP)
- (1991) "Non Euclidian Spaces" (ASCAP)

=== Software ===
- Catchbox, Pentagraphics, TRS-80
- RacerMax, Pentagraphics, TRS-80
- Kindergarten Fun, Pentagraphics, TRS-80
- Return to Horror House, Pentagraphics, TRS-80
- A-Mazed, Pentagraphics, TRS-80
- Magni Modis, Pentagraphics, PC and Amiga, interactive animated story
- Marooned on Mars, Pentagraphics, PC, choose-your-path story
- Hell's Casino, Pentagraphics, Legend of the Red Dragon BBS module
- Cyprian, Pentagraphics, PC, MechWarrior 2: Mercenaries multiplayer mission
- ZZX, Pentagraphics, PC, MechWarrior 2: Mercenaries multiplayer mission

== See also ==
- List of horror fiction authors
- HWA Silver Hammer Award
- List of people from Missouri
