= MileHiCon =

Science fiction convention held in Denver, Colorado

- Status: Active
- Genre: Science fiction/Fantasy
- Venue: Hyatt Regency Tech Center-Denver
- Location: Denver, Colorado
- Country: United States
- Inaugurated: 1969; 57 years ago
- Attendance: 900–1100
- Organizer: MileHiCon, Inc.
- Filing status: Not-for-profit
- Website: www.milehicon.org

MileHiCon is an annual science fiction and fantasy convention held in Denver, Colorado in October. Although it has a primarily literary focus, it also has an art show, a vendors' room, Critter Crunch (similar to Robot Wars), Critter Float-illa (robotic competition in the hotel pool), a video room, an anime room, a masquerade, gaming, a bat'leth tournament, and programming on science, writing, literary, and media. It runs its own track of child-friendly, interactive programming and also hosts the Avistrum Academy of Sorcery. It is run by MileHiCon, Inc., a Colorado not-for-profit corporation, and donates money each year to local literacy programs.

== History ==
MileHiCon was started by the Denver Area Science Fiction Association (DASFA). Following the monthly meeting in September 1969, several DASFA fans discussed their recent experiences at the St. Louis WorldCon and decided to hold a science fiction Mini-Convention for the next meeting. However, due to planning and scheduling conflicts, it was postponed until November.

The name of the evening-long event was shortened to Minicon. It was held in the basement meeting room of the Columbia Savings Bank, where DASFA met at that time. Since the Minicon name was taken by an organization in Minneapolis, DASFA decided to rename it Octocon, since it was to be held in October. After several years of holding Octocon, DASFA discovered there was a convention in Ireland called Octocon. Two final proposals for the new title were:

- "MileHiCon," which plays off Denver being "the Mile-High City", and would be unlikely to be duplicated;
- "LungfishGranolaCon," which refers to an ancient DASFA tradition of lungfish jokes, a type of word game.

"MileHiCon" was chosen after a close vote.

Around 1980, MileHiCon was incorporated as an entity separate from DASFA (which still meets but is not incorporated). For the last several years, attendance has generally hovered around 1,000 people.

MileHiCon 43 was held 21–23 October 2011. Guests included authors Vernor Vinge and Glen Cook, and editor Gardner Dozois with artist guest Theresa Mather. Denver author Mario Acevedo was the toastmaster.

MileHiCon 44 was held 19–21 October 2012. Guests included authors Cherie Priest and C. J. Henderson, with artist guest Stephen Hickman. Colorado author Stephen Graham Jones was the toastmaster.

MileHiCon 45 was held 18–20 October 2013. Guests included authors Seanan McGuire and Catherynne Valente, and artist Aaron B. Miller. New Mexico author Ian Tregillis was the toastmaster.

MileHiCon 46 was held 24–26 October 2014. Guests included authors Daniel Abraham and Ty Franck (who also write together as James S. A. Corey) and Michael Swanwick. Artist guests were Phil Foglio and Kaja Foglio. Denver author Jeanne C. Stein was the toastmaster.

MileHiCon 47 was held 23–25 October 2015. Guests included authors Kevin Hearne and Kristine Kathryn Rusch. Artist guest was Ursula Vernon. James Van Pelt was the toastmaster.

MileHiCon 48 Was held 28–30 October 2016. Guests included authors John Varley and Kelley Armstrong. Artist guest was Julie Dillon. Chaz Kemp was the toastmaster.

MileHiCon 49 was 28–30 October 2017. Guests included authors Eric Flint and Jane Lindskold. Artist guest was Carrie Ann Baade. Author Jason Heller was the toastmaster.

MileHiCon 50 was 19–21 October 2018. All past guests of honor have been invited back for the semi-centennial celebration.

MileHiCon 51 was 18–20 October 2019. Guest included authors Angela Roquet and Marie Brennan. Artist guest was Elizabeth Leggett. Author Carol Berg was the toastmaster.

MileHiCon 52 was 23–25 October 2020. The convention was held virtually in response to the COVID-19 pandemic.

MileHiCon 53 was 1–3 October 2021.

MileHiCon 54 was 21–23 October 2022.

MileHiCon 55 was 27–30 October 2023. Author Drew Hayes was the guest of honor.
