= Star Trek Explorer =

Quarterly periodical published by Titan UK

- Editor: Star Trek Monthly; John Freeman – #1–25; Darryl Curtis – #26–64; Nick Jones – #65–89; Toby Weidmann – #90–117; John Freeman – #118–127; Brian J. Robb – #128–129; Paul Simpson – #130–166; Christopher Cooper – #167–192; Nick Jones – #193-207; Star Trek Explorer; Nick Jones – #1-#4; John Freeman – #5-14
- Categories: Science fiction related
- Frequency: Quarterly
- First issue: March 1995
- Final issue: December 24, 2024; 5 months ago
- Company: Titan Magazines
- Country: United Kingdom
- Website: Official website

Star Trek Explorer is an authorized periodical, published quarterly by Titan UK in the United Kingdom, Ireland, Australia, and New Zealand devoted to the Star Trek franchise; a separate North American version is also published, differing primarily in issue number, but otherwise synchronised in content. In terms of content, the magazine features news, interviews, and reviews covering all the live-action series, the animated series, the film series, and other official media, including books and computer games. The magazine ceased publication in December, 2024.

== Publication history ==
Star Trek Magazine was the first regular magazine to be published by Titan Magazines and is its longest-running title. It was launched in February 1995 as Star Trek Monthly, soon after the first broadcast of Star Trek: Voyager.

Early in its run, the magazine featured reprints of several DC Comics-produced comics, but this ended after issue 22.

With issue 113, the publication went to a bi-monthly release schedule and increased its page count from 68 to 100. Before this change, various issues were special "bumper" releases (100 pages, costing £4.99, usually with a gift – typically a Titan-released Trek book) to commemorate a specific occasion, such as the 30th and 35th anniversaries, the end of Star Trek: Deep Space Nine, and others.

A separate North American edition of the magazine came into being in August 2006, otherwise synchronized with the British version for contents, due in part to the loss of the Star Trek: Communicator in 2005, which had aggravated the previous 2003 loss of Star Trek: The Magazine, leaving the home market devoid of any and all "official" Star Trek' franchise magazines. Issue #1 of the run – bi-monthly like the British edition – was released on 22 August 2006. Numbering of the UK edition maintained its internal continuity, with the US #1 being relatively the same as UK issue 128. Later US editions returned to 68 pages in length, with the additional UK pages being inserted in the form of a supplement at the centre of the magazine. This practice was quickly discontinued, and the various editions were standardized with issue 134.

The magazine is printed in the United States rather than the UK, meaning that American distribution now takes place sometime before UK release. A special cover is available for specialist comic shops ordering via the Diamond Previews magazine.

For issue 137, and all subsequent 100-page editions, a new binding format and magazine size was introduced. The issue was perfect bound (instead of saddle-stitched) and measured 8 inches wide × 11 inches high (instead of 9 × 12). The following issue retained the size but returned to saddle-stitching. With this issue, the British edition lost its 100-page length, becoming 68 pages long.

The frequency with which the title has been published has further varied over the years, with an increase in output to eight issues a year in early 2009 (with issue 143), followed by a decrease to quarterly (along with an additional yearly publication) from 2012 onwards. With the latest change to its publication schedule, the magazine has now returned to regularly being 100 pages in length.

In August 2021, the magazine changed its name to Star Trek Explorer.

Star Trek Explorer's final issue was published on 24 December 2024. It featured an interview with William Shatner and a synopsis of the magazine's history.
