= Tannhäuser (board game) =

2007 wargame

- Publishers: Take On You (former); Fantasy Flight Games (current)
- Players: 2-10
- Playing time: 1 to 2 hours
- Chance: Dice rolling

Tannhäuser is a 2007 board wargame from Take On You which takes place in an alternate reality. Each player controls an elite team who are attempting to shift the balance of power in this stalemate between nations. Originally a French game, an American company, Fantasy Flight Games, was providing the English distribution and recently acquired all rights to the property, continuing to support the game by releasing additional expansions.

== Gameplay ==
Line of sight for attack is judged by colored paths. Stosstruppen (left) is on a grey path which can attack McNeal (right) who is on a grey and blue path but not Brown (background) who is on a just blue path.

Tannhäuser is a squad-based action board game where the gameplay focuses on two separate teams of up to five characters each that can either be played between two players controlling a team or up to ten players controlling each character. Each character is represented by a uniquely modeled figure, with equipment represented by tokens. The game utilizes an original game mechanic known as the "Pathfinding System". Each game board displays a printed top down view of a location with a series of circles that displays where figures can move, while also displaying one or multiple colours that indicate line of sight, being the "pathfinding". For example, a figure on an orange ring can see, thus attack at range an opposing figure also currently on an orange ring or a multi-coloured one that also displays that same colour. Multi-coloured rings typically occur on intersections or doorways.

Each figure has a character sheet that displays their current equipment tokens and stats, the latter of which can change via a slider based on how damaged they are. Originally equipment and their effects were outlined on separate sheets/in the rule book until equipment cards were introduced into the core gameplay, allowing simplified methods of following their rules. There are two kinds of characters/figures, Heroes and Troopers, with teams allowing three heroes and two troopers. Heroes are named individual characters while troopers are less strong than heroes but numerous (and with figure expansions multiple versions of each kind). Latter expansions introduced Epic Heroes that are far stronger than typical heroes but take up one normal hero and trooper slot, limiting the squad to just four.

The game features multiple modes of play, each with slightly different rules and objectives. Deathmatch is the standard modes where both squads must permanently destroy all members of the opposing player(s). Story mode provides a narrative with specific objectives that require securing that along with eliminating players (that can respawn) also gaining victory points for total end of game score. More scripted Story modes are character-based, typically with predetermined characters and rule changes. Additional modes include other squad-based objectives. These include Capture the Flag through capturing and retaining the opponents flag marker, Dominion through securing certain points across the board and King of the Hill where eliminating the leader of each squad is the only way to secure victory point. Regardless of mode each map typically comes with random item pick ups, obstacles and spawning points, also represented by additional tokens.

Upon its initial release, the core base game included a double-sided board (one side is the interior of "Castle Ksiaz", the reverse side is the Crypt found beneath the castle), two factions (Reich and Union) comprising 10 pre-painted plastic miniatures, 10 character cards, 6 ten-sided dice (referred to as d10s), and 160 cardboard tokens.

The fourth faction announced in May 2011 adds a new dynamic to squads and factions in the form one of two new alliances where characters from two factions make up a single squad. The Reich and Shogunate factions form the Nippon Accords and the Union and Matriarchy factions form UMTOMA.

== Story ==
The game is set in an alternate historical setting of 1949 and onward, albeit with many fantastical elements. Instead of the events that played out during the First World War, the conflict has raged on beyond the normal timeline of events, including the Second World War. In this war the Western European and North American nations have formed the "Union" that under the inventive direction of Thomas Edison have developed new forms of weaponry, along with new discoveries of secret alien technology. The German Reich meanwhile has mastered the use of occult powers, including the creation of new demonic soldiers through the excavation of one of four Cardinal Points, gateways to hellish dimensions with the new discoveries led by the Marquis General, Hermann Von Heïzinger. In order to prevent the Reich from finding the remaining points, the Union has deployed an elite team led by John MacNeal.

Recent developments however have forced the still Tsar-ruled Russian Empire, now currently known as the "Matriarchy", to enter the war. Along with the inventions developed by Nikola Tesla, such as new electrical-based weaponry and robotics, the Matriarchy have sought after the power of ancient Slavic gods to aid them in the war effort, which has led them to utilize new and powerful ground troops. In the east, Japan has emerged from a civil war with the Shogun reintroduced, fast becoming a new great power in the world, shrouded in secrecy and otherworldly magic. Due to this, the Reich quickly politically maneuvered itself into negotiating and signing a military pact known as the Nippon Accords. Because of this new alliance, the Matriarchy and Union formed a similar treaty of their own known as UMTOMA (Union and Matriarchy Treaty of Mutual Assistance) for defense against the Reich and the Shogunate.

=== Factions ===
==== Union ====
The Union is a collective alliance of North American and Western Europe currently led by President Thomas Edison. The Roswell UFO incident in 1947 led the Union to the discovery of extraterrestrial technology to be utilized in the development of new and powerful weaponry in the war against the Reich. By spearheading these operations with his son, Edison was able to gain influence eventually becoming the Union president. Covert operations are performed by an elite unit headed by Major John McNeal, a long-standing war veteran. Amongst his squad includes Tala, a Navajo demolitions expert, Sergent Brown who wields an experimental heavy weapon, among two specialist soldier recruits. The Union specializes in a variety of firepower and explosives, both conventional and experimental, including traps and other gadgets for use in combat.

==== Reich ====
Continuing the reign of the German Empire from the First World War, the Reich is ruled under what is now known as the "lich Kaiser" who rules an extreme and oppressive totalitarian regime. The Reich has continued its rule through the channeling and use of other worldly dark powers through the occult. These occult practices are run by the Marquis General Herman Von Heïzinger who along with the Obscura Korps of the 13th Occult Division are attempting to locate the magical lost relics, particularly the Obscura Cardinal Cornerstones that can open dimensional portals to hell itself. Heïzinger himself can utilize psychic abilities while his personal bodyguard Karl Zerman is a demonic super soldier with phantasmal like weaponry and abilities. In addition to the Korp is Eva Kramer, a specialist assassin and investigator. The Reich utilizes its dark powers within his troops, with the Schocktruppen class who are also specialized with knowledge of other worldly powers and the Stosstruppen who are literally demon-human hybrids. While the historical basis for the Reich is the First World War, the art style and character design is closer to that of Nazi Germany.

==== Matriarchy ====
Descended from Tsarist Russian Empire, the Matriarchy is now under Anastasia Nikolaevna, co-ruled with her new husband Grigori Rasputin. It made a late entry into the war, after new developments within its military infrastructure. Nikola Tesla defected to the Matriarchy from the Union and used his knowledge and resources to develop advanced electrical technology. Through Project Svarog, new forms of electrical weaponry and machinery were developed for use in the war. These new technologies were also used to channel energy from the old Slavic gods and revive them. These energies could be harnessed through newly developed powered suits of armor. The first of these was known as Zor'Ka who utilizes powerful and mystical electrical energies. Zor'Ka is assisted by Irina Kravchenko, a holy agent and Irishka Voronin, an engineer who specializes with the new mystical technologies. In addition to powers from the gods, the Matriarchy also specializes in robotics with three-legged automatons known as Voivodes armed with weaponized electrical coils. The faction however has a separatist group known as the New Guard with similar ideals and technology to those of Zor'Ka yet in opposition to Rasputin.

==== Shogunate ====
The Shogunate are a new militaristic empire that emerged following a civil war in Japan that led to Emperor Meiji eventually consolidate his power by reintroducing the Shogun-system of rule under Shogun Hatamoto. Their sudden rise to power and invasion of mainland Asia was brought about through secret practices and rituals unknown to the other world powers. Secret covert operations are carried by Iroh Minamoto, also known as the daimyō who also leads a shadowy ninja assassin Mizu Kage and a human-demon oni-like beast known as Itami. They are backed up by Ashigaru soldiers and Shin agents. The Shogunate uses a combination of close-combat, stealth and ambush tactics to wear down opponents.

== Development and expansions ==
The first full expansion entitled Tannhäuser: Operation Novogrod introduced a third faction known as Russian Matriarchy with their own seven miniatures and tokens along with an additional game board with a new map and unique objectives and tokens, along with gameplay tweaks to the core gameplay.

While not a full expansion, a second map supplement entitled Tannhauser: Daedalus Map Pack Expansion introduced two new maps on a double-sided game board with unique objectives such a series of trials for squads using multiple arrangements of one map, along with additional tokens including creature markers hostile to both teams, along with a unique game mode for solo play. In addition to new boards and scenarios, individual miniatures have been regularly released, expanding the total choice of characters for each faction, including mercenaries that can be used in any faction. Epic Heroes were also introduced starting with Asteros miniature that are very powerful characters but take up two character ranks; a hero and trooper position. Each character miniature comes with equipment tokens and a booklet that includes set ups and rules for unique character-based story missions.

In May 2011, a fourth faction known as the Shogunate, an alternative Imperial Japan was announced. However unlike the Operation Novogrod expansion, all new Shogunate miniatures were released gradually as separate character packs rather than a boxed expansion. Complete rules for the faction, along with unique missions were released with the third map supplement entitled "Operation Hinansho Expansion" in late 2011 shortly after the latest Shogunate releases.

On 12 July 2012, Fantasy Flight games announced, along with a new character pack that the company would finish its current release of expansion feeling that plenty of choice within the game has been developed. The base game and its expansions however are still currently in print for potential new players. Despite this, the announcement also concluded with the prospect of returning to the franchise in the future.

=== Expansion list ===
The following includes all current and future releases:

Expansion	Description	Released
Wolfgang Otto Ludwig Friedrich - "Wolf"	Single miniature mercenary character that can be used as a hero for any faction.	2007 (Promotional); December 2010 (Sold)
Yula Korlïtz	Single miniature character that can be used as a hero for the Reich faction.	2007
Operation Novogrod	New Matriarchy faction with seven single miniature characters and map board expansion and tokens with unique game modes and missions.	2009
Gorgeï Volkov	Single miniature mercenary character that can be used as a hero for any faction but will not fight against the Matriarchy.	2009
Ramirez Sergio Delastillas	Single miniature character with a support mobile device miniature that can be used as a hero for the Union faction.	2009
Reich Troop Pack	Two repainted miniatures of the two original Reich troops to expand the variables of troop centric squads.	August 2010
Union Troop Pack	Two repainted miniatures of the two original Union troops to expand the variables of troop centric squads.	August 2010
Caitlin "Hoax" Lamsbury	Single miniature character with three additional "cloaked" version miniatures that can be used as a hero for the Union faction.	December 2010
Asteros	Single miniature mercenary character and "Epic Hero" class that can be used for any faction in place of one hero and troop.	January 2011
Operation Daedalus	Map board expansion and tokens with unique game modes and missions.	January 2011
Oksana	Single miniature mercenary character with two additional backup robot miniatures that can be used as a hero for the Union faction or the Matriarchy faction in the place of the character Zor'ka.	February 2011
Hoss Harbinger	Single miniature character that can be used as a hero for the Reich faction.	March 2011
Equipment Cards	Over 200 printed cards with rules for every equipment token for all releases up to Hoss Harbinger. Future releases include these cards along with the usual tokens.	March 2011
Iroh Minamoto - "The Daimyo"	Single miniature hero class character for the Shogunate faction.	September 2011
Shogunate Troop Pack	Two single miniature troop class characters for the Shogunate faction.	September 2011
Mizu Kage	Single miniature hero class character for the Shogunate faction.	October 2011
Itami	Single miniature hero class character for the Shogunate faction.	October 2011
Natalya	Single miniature character that can be used as an epic hero for the Matriarchy faction.	November 2011
Operation Hinansho	Map board expansion and tokens with unique game modes and missions in addition to Shogunate faction-centric team rules.	December 2011
Matriarchy Troop Pack	Two single miniature troop class characters for the Matriarchy faction.	March 2012
Edison	Single miniature character that can be used as a hero for the Union faction.	August 2012
Frankenstahl	Single miniature character that can be used as an epic hero for the Reich faction. The final release with future development currently on hold.	November 2012

== Reception ==
=== Reviews ===
- Rebel Times #2
- Świat Gier Planszowych #4

== Novels ==
In addition to the back story text given in the base game and expansion rule books, three novels set within the Tannhauser fictional universe featuring the various characters in the board game. All novels were published by Fantasy Flight Games themselves.

The first novel titled Tannhauser: Rising Sun, Falling Shadows was written by Robert T. Jeschonek and released worldwide in June 2012. The story follows Union Major John McNeal and his squad as they attempt to intercept unknown plans regarding otherworldly powers being made between the Reich and the Shogunate at the Kronotsky volcano on the Russian Kamchatka Peninsula.

The second novel titled Tannhauser: Operation Night Eagle was written by Blaine Pardoe and released in October 2012. The story follows a Union military campaign to counter an imminent invasion by the Reich, led by the formidable Marquis General von Heïzinger. His objective is the powerful Kensington Runestone. In response, the Union deploys the 42nd Marine Special Forces to stop him. Meanwhile, the Matriarchy's Holy Commissar, Irina Kravchenko, launches her own mission through Canada, determined to claim the runestone for her faction.

The third novel titled Tannhauser: Enigma was written by James Swallow and released in May 2013 The story revolves around a powerful device called the "Enigma" developed by the Reich, which grants its army demonic powers. The novel follows RAF pilot Nick Cross and special agent Caitlin "Hoax" Lambsbury as they team up to steal the Enigma from the Reich.
