= Peter J. Wacks =

American fiction and game writer

- Born: California, U.S
- Citizenship: American
- Occupations: Author, actor, game developer
- Writing career
- Period: 1984–present
- Genres: Science fiction, fantasy, horror.
- Notable work: Cyberpunk

Peter J. Wacks (born 1976) is an American author, actor and game developer. Some of his works include, Cyberpunk, the graphic novel, Behind These Eyes, and Caller of Lightning.

== Career ==
In 2003, Wacks acquired a game spin-off license from R. Talsorian Games for the Cyberpunk 2020 role-playing game, and created Cyberpunk: The Collectible Card Game. He also worked on the franchise, Predator.

As a writer, Wacks wrote "Cat's Paw", which was published in the anthology Of Fur and Fire: Tales of Cats & Dragons (2011). In 2012, he co-authored Behind These Eyes, a graphic novel along Guy Anthony De Marco. In 2014, he wrote Second Paradigm, a science fiction book, and co-wrote Solar Singularity, which was selected as a finalist for the juried International Association of Media Tie-in Writers annual Scribe award for 2018. Wacks and De Marco had also previously worked as writers on the core rule book for Interface Zero 2.0: Full Metal Cyberpunk, an RPG game which was a finalist for the 2015 ENnie Award for the original interior art.

== Reception ==
At the 2013 Bram Stoker Awards, Behind These Eyes was a finalist in the category Best Graphic Novel of 2012.

== Bibliography ==
Science fictions (co-authored)

- 1 Bloodletting Part 1 (2014) ISBN 9781614751304 (with Mark Ryan)
- 2 Bloodletting Part 2 (2015) ISBN 9781614753650 (with Mark Ryan)
- 3 Caller of Lightning (2020) ISBN 9781982124632
- Solar Singularity (2017) with Guy Anthony De Marco and Josh Vogt ISBN 9781614755111
- Hair of the Wolf (2014) ISBN 9781614752509
- Predator: If It Bleeds (2017) ISBN 9781785655401
- The Dandy Boys Mysteries (2015) ISBN 9781614752134

Novels & anthologies

- Second Paradigm (2012) ISBN 9781614751809
- A Long Way from Home (2016) ISBN 9783838778075
- Howl (2009) ISBN 9780984379705

Short Fiction Series

- Space Opera (2013) ISBN 9780988125766
- Change of Mind (2015) with Kevin J. Anderson in Fiction River: Pulse pounders (2018) ISBN 9781561466078
- The Game-a-holic's Guide to Life, Love, and Ruling the World (2017) ISBN 9781476782133
- The Key (2017) ISBN 9781481482691
- Shotgun Wedding (2020). ISBN 9781953134028
- It's a Mud, Mud World (2020) with Bryan Thomas Schmidt ISBN 9781982124915

Essays

- Preface (L. Ron Hubbard Presents Writers of the Future Volume 31) (2015) ISBN 9781619863224
- Introduction (Surviving Tomorrow) (2020) ISBN 9781953134028
