= HWA Silver Hammer Award =

The Horror Writers Association (HWA) periodically gives the Silver Hammer Award to an HWA volunteer who has done a truly massive amount of work for the organization, often unsung and behind the scenes. It was instituted in 1996, and is decided by a vote of HWA's board of trustees.

The award is so named because it represents the careful, steady, continuous work of building HWA's "house" — the many institutional systems that keep the organization functioning on a day-to-day basis. The award itself is a chrome-plated hammer with an engraved plaque on the handle. The chrome hammer is also a satisfying allusion to The Beatles' song, "Maxwell's Silver Hammer", a miniature horror story in itself.

In September 2022 the HWA announced that the award would be renamed the Karen Lansdale Silver Hammer Award, in honour of her work establishing the organisation, and that the award itself would be redesigned.

The Horror Writers Association is a worldwide organization promoting dark literature and its creators. It has over 700 members who write, edit and publish professionally in fiction, nonfiction, videogames, films, comics, and other media.

== Past winners ==
Past award winners include:

- (1997) Lawrence Watt-Evans and Robert Weinberg
- (1998) Sheldon Jaffery
- (2001) Nancy Etchemendy
- (2003) Douglas E. Winter
- (2004) Robert Weinberg (second award)
- (2005) Stephen Dorato
- (2006) Donna K. Fitch
- (2008) Sephera Giron
- (2009) Kathryn Ptacek
- (2010) Angel Leigh McCoy
- (2011) Guy Anthony De Marco
- (2012) Charles Day
- (2013) Norman Rubenstein
- (2014) Rena Mason
- (2015) Michael Knost
- (2016) James Chambers
- (2017) Kenneth Cain
- (2018) Jess Landry
- (2019) Leslie S. Klinger
- (2020) Carina Bissett, Brian W. Matthews
- (2021) Kevin J. Wetmore, Jr.
- (2022) Karen Lansdale
- (2023) Lila Denning
- (2024) Jonathan Lees

== See also ==
- Horror Writers Association
- Bram Stoker Award
