= Futility Closet =

History podcast and website

- Genre: history podcast

Publication
- No. of episodes: 367

Reception
- Ratings: 4.764705882352941/5

Related
- Website: https://www.futilitycloset.com

Futility Closet is a blog, podcast, and database started in 2005 by editorial manager and publishing journalist Greg Ross. As of February 2021 the database totaled over 11,000 items. They range over the fields of history, literature, language, art, philosophy, and recreational mathematics.

The associated Futility Closet Podcast is a weekly podcast hosted by Greg and his wife Sharon Ross. It presented curious and little-known events and people from history, and posed logical puzzles.

== History ==
In January 2005, Greg Ross started the Futility Closet website, an online wunderkammer of trivia, quotations, mathematical curiosities, chess problems, and other diversions. The site has spawned two printed collections, and continues to be updated daily. Gary Antonick of the New York Times' Numberplay blog described the first book as "the literary equivalent of Trader Joe's Tempting Trail Mix".

Futility Closet has sometimes been a conduit or used to popularize results by John H. Conway, Richard K. Guy, Lee Sallows, Solomon W. Golomb, and many other well-known mathematicians when they dabbled in recreational mathematics. Puzzles from Futility Closet have frequently been featured in the New York Times puzzle section and the New York Times blog. Futility Closet was recommended by the Honduran newspaper La Tribuna. Its puzzles and paradoxes have been cited by El País and Il Post.

== Podcast ==
In March 2014 Futility Closet launched a thirty-minute weekly podcast hosted by Greg and Sharon Ross. A typical episode lasts thirty minutes and consists of three segments: first the week's core topic, typically a curious story from history; Second, listener mail; third, a lateral thinking puzzle, posed by one of the hosts for the other to solve. Some episodes depart from this format, for instance by presenting several short items or open questions culled from research, or by presenting several puzzles in lieu of other content. Many earlier episodes include an advertisement. Most episodes also include a reference to Sasha, the Futility Closet cat until the cat died in 2020.

On the November 15, 2021, podcaster Sharon announced the podcast would be ending at the end of November.

=== Content and sources ===
The podcast has a wide scope and is not restricted to any particular era, but most episodes concern colorful personalities and strange events from the 19th and early 20th centuries. Victorian oddities are a mainstay of the show, as are unexplained mysteries, forteana, hoaxes and impostors, sensational murders, remarkable animals, and the adventures of mariners, aviators, and explorers. Subjects are often prompted by listener suggestions. Some content has been sourced directly from Wikipedia without attribution.

=== Music ===
The podcast's opening theme is an instrumental bass composition, "Fallen Star", which was written and performed by Doug Ross, brother of Greg. Doug Ross also supplies the bass riffs that punctuate the transitions between episode segments.

=== Reception ===
The Futility Closet Podcast has been praised by James Harkin of No Such Thing as a Fish, and by economist Tim Harford. Joshua Gelernter of The Weekly Standard described Futility Closet as "one of the most interesting websites on the internet." Michael Förtsch of Wired.de named the Futility Closet Podcast as one of seven podcasts to make you smarter. The podcast was praised by Colin Patrick of Mental Floss, by Jennifer K. Bauer of Inland360.com, and by Kayla Matthews of Makeuseof.com, who praised Greg Ross's scrupulous research. Gizmodo's Robbie Gonzalez praised the site's lateral thinking puzzles. Futility Closet was praised by Steve Dodson of the linguistics blog Languagehat, and was cited by the linguist Ben Yagoda at the Lingua Franca blog.

Futility Closet's segment on the Canadian candy boycott was featured on CBC Radio.

=== Support ===
At the time of its launch, the podcast was supported chiefly by advertisements and one-time donations. By the end of 2014 a Patreon campaign had been established.

== See also ==
- Lateral thinking
