= Vertical thinking =

Thinking technique that involves an analytical approach to problem solving

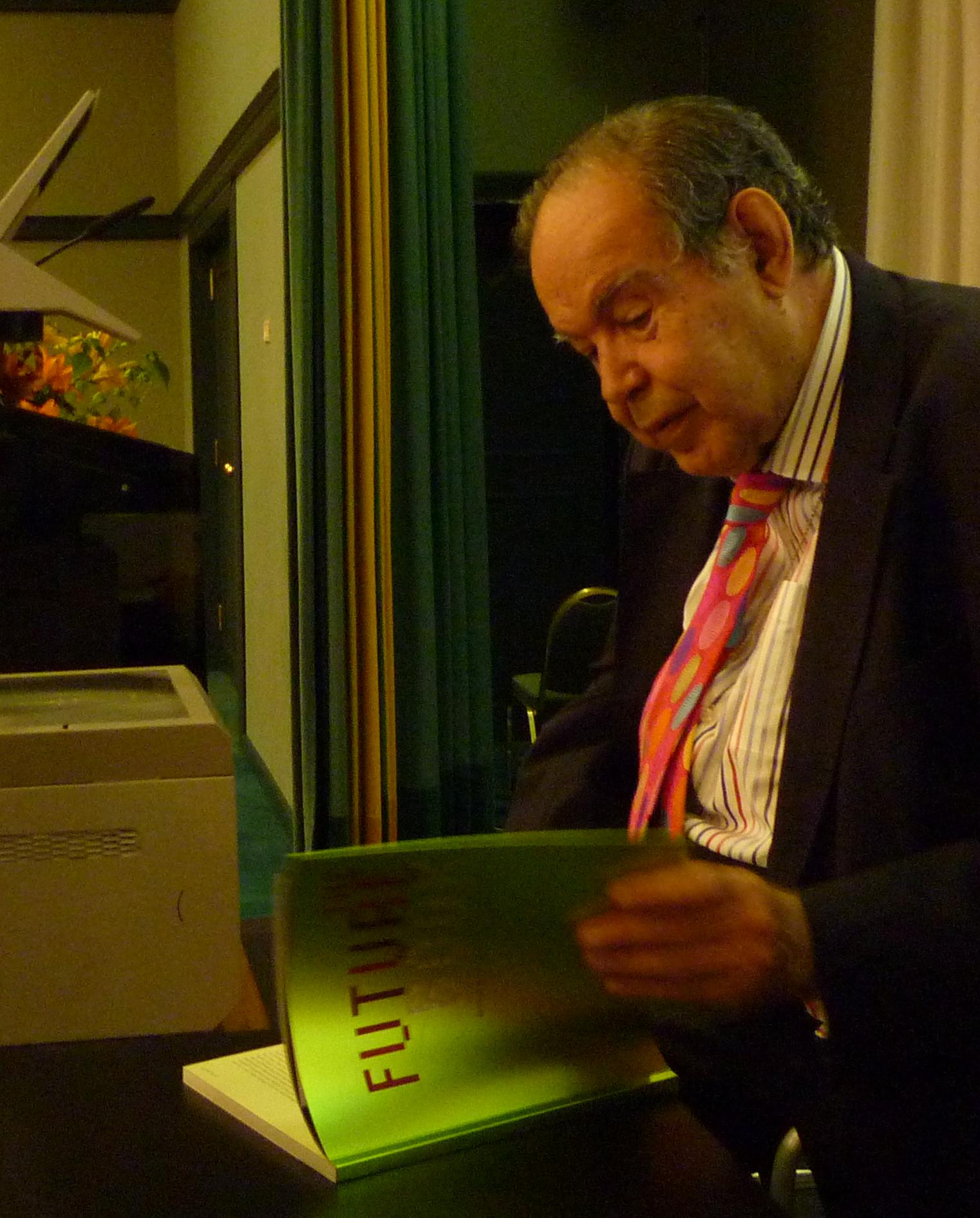
Edward de Bono, founder of vertical and lateral thinking concepts

Vertical thinking is a type of approach to problems that usually involves one being selective, analytical, and sequential. It could be said that it is the opposite of lateral thinking. Unlike lateral thinking that involves using added intuition, risk taking, and imagination through unconscious and subconscious processes, vertical thinking consists of using more of a conscious approach via rational assessment in order to take in information or make decisions. This type of thinking encourages individuals to employ a sequential approach to solving problem where a creative and multidirectional response are seen as imprudent. Vertical thinkers prefer to rely on external data and facts in order to avoid failure or counterfactual thinking.

== Origin of the term ==
The notion of "vertical thinking" as a method of solving problems was first introduced by Edward de Bono and can be traced back to his publication of Lateral Thinking: Creativity Step by Step in the year 1970. In the book, the concept of vertical thinking can be seen to have many parallels with that of "critical thinking". De Bono explains in his text that the main distinguishing factor between the two concepts is the fact that critical thinking only involves thinking rationally, whereas vertical thinking requires the individual to apply the modus in forming a solution.

== Relevance ==
"Vertical thinking is selection by exclusion. One works within a frame of reference and throws out what is not relevant. With lateral thinking one realizes that a pattern cannot be restructured from within itself but only as the result of some outside influence" – Edward de Bono

Similar to the concepts of convergent thinking, the intention of vertical thinking is to derive a single compelling answer to a problem. Vertical thinking is most applicable in scenarios where the answer is already existing and needs to be elucidated through sequential means. In this regard, the answer acquired through vertical thinking is often seen as the "most correct" when considering the information available to the individual. With regards to the interpretation of de Bono, individuals are not obligated to adhere a single method of thinking but rather form solutions through the synthesis of both. Though different individuals may have varying preferences in terms of the method of thinking applied, a balance of both is generally seen as most suitable when generating a solution for any problem.

== Practical application ==
The utilitarian applications of almost every "method of thinking" can be seen as seemingly endless as individuals can apply such methods of thinking in practically any scenario. However, the creation of vertical thinking was meant to serve as a tool to incite critical thinking in individuals from a young age. Though not as widely renown as Six Thinking Hats, the works of de Bono in this case can again be seen as a tool to assist teachers in an academic setting. De Bono saw it as vital for the individuals categorized under the developing age to acknowledge the concept of critical thinking. However, this was not meant to dissuade the use of creativity in problem solving, but rather endorse a balance of both. The works of de Bono were further broadened by Paul Sloane who developed the Situation puzzle.

The situation puzzles are a series of puzzles where every question has a number of possible answers, as well as one being the most correct. Children playing the game are rewarded not only for correctly selecting the most correct answer, but also for identifying other answers that were a possibility. Through this method both lateral and vertical thinking abilities of the individual are developed simultaneously as well as allowing teachers to assess which type of "thinker" the child fits best. The discernment and classification of a child's thinking pattern is extremely valuable for teachers when it comes to development. Due to this, the practical application of the concepts derived from de Bono has an overwhelming progressive influence in the academic setting.

Introduction of these concepts to a child are said to be most useful from the ages 4 onward. When considering existing adolescent trends with regards to cognitive development, it is around the age of 4 that individuals begin to realize that thoughts may not always be true. This is around the age where the ability to acquire knowledge through induction occurs for the child. Thus, the ability to think sequentially (in this case being classified as vertical thinking) is a concept that will begin to resonate with the child. Due to the fact that individuals generally affiliate themselves with a single method of thinking, being either vertical or lateral, Paul Sloane suggests the introduction of such situation puzzles at a young age. This is said to help stimulate the type of thinking the child would otherwise not be comfortable with.

Benefits for children of developing these thinking skills include, but are not limited to:

- Achieve stability both socially and emotionally
- Develop physiological maturity at a younger age
- Limit levels of anger and aggression
- Perform at a higher level in classrooms
- Improve personal and professional life

== Vertical thinking vs lateral thinking ==
In the aforementioned book written by de Bono (Lateral Thinking: Creativity Step by Step), the concept of lateral thinking is expressed as the polar opposite to the vertical thinking.

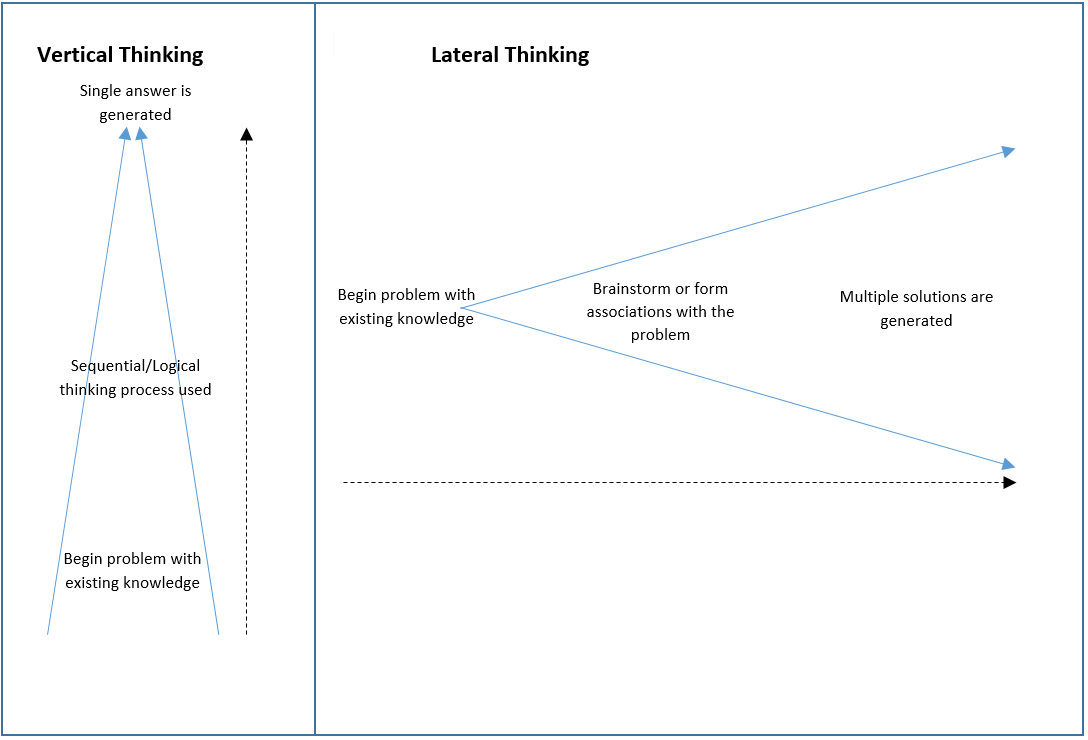
Visual representation of the thinking process involved

=== Linearity ===
Vertical thinking is distinguished as something that is "linear", while on the other hand lateral thinking can be seen as "non-linear". Vertical thinking utilizes a sequential method in solving problem, where only one solution is generally realized. On the other hand, due to the non-linear nature of lateral thinking multiple solutions to the problems are fashioned in a more imaginative manner.

=== Objective ===
The objective in vertical thinking is to create a solution that demonstrates the "depth of knowledge" whereas the use of lateral thinking creates a solution where the "breadth of knowledge" is exhibited. The depth of knowledge in an elucidation predominantly reflects how well the individual can construct a logical justification for their solution with regards to detail. In contrast, breadth of knowledge would express how well the individual can come up with a variety of solutions for the same problem. Disregarding aspects of logic and creativity of solutions, the disparity in objectives can be seen as a case of "quality against quantity".

=== Conclusiveness ===
Compared to lateral thinking where the number of solutions generated is only limited by the individual's ingenuity, the solutions formed through vertical thinking is a finite process. By basing the outcome on existing knowledge rather than expending the depths of your creativity in forming a solution, there are generally only a few possible answers within logical limitations. Hence, the number of solutions are viewed as finite and in most cases are only limited to one.

== Criticism ==
Following the publication of de Bono's Lateral Thinking: Creativity Step by Step in the year 1970, Richard Paul and Linda Elder co-published the book Critical Thinking: Tools for Taking Charge. De Bono is addressed directly in the book and fact that in the real world the application of merely one method of thinking is fictitious is called upon. It is mentioned that due to the human cognitive process, the alignment towards a single method of thinking is simply not possible. Even when individuals adopt a sequential method of solving a problem, between the initiation and conclusion of the question there has to exist some form of creativity. Furthermore, in response to how de Bono suggests the incitement of critical thinking in youth, Paul and Elder argue that critical thinking is not established, but rather an innate ability that every individual possesses.

== Evaluation of the concept ==
De Bono discussed that vertical thinking is a selective process while lateral thinking can be seen as generative. An example of a straight line from point A to B can further illustrate this point. Through vertical thinking, where the most optimum answer is generated, the individual would simply move from A to B without any further exploration. Lateral thinking on the other hand can be seen more as that of a spider's web. As the individual begins to travel from the core of the web, the paths diverge into many more possibilities.

Though the usage of vertical thinking is often favored over lateral thinking in most academic fields such as those of science and mathematics, there are noticeable shortcomings when considering this method of thinking. Vertical thinking is often preferred when considering academical backgrounds as the thought process provides a credible plotting. Due to the sequential nature of the thought process, the steps required to reach an outcome are often easily drawn from. This often adds to the perceived legitimacy as well as allow for easier verification of validity. Furthermore, when considering the linear approach, the solutions generated from such methods of thinking are often neutral, which is again preferred when bearing in mind an academic background. Moreover, the risks of this method of thinking is much lower than that of lateral thinking. Backed by an existing knowledge base, solutions generated using this method are more well informed.

Due to the perfectionism generally involved when creating a solution, there is often a lack of originality in the answers. Referring to this point, most innovative ideas were not created through vertical thinking as ideas generated this way can be seen as mundane, as it is only based on existing knowledge. To quote Henry Ford, "If I had asked people what they wanted, they would have said faster horses." The creation of the car engine can serve to exemplify the short-comings of vertical thinking as we would still be riding horses today if an original approach to transportation was not realized. Lastly, the use of lateral thinking as opposed to vertical thinking allows individuals to make connections between completely unrelated fields, in many cases leading to the generation of ideas that transcends existing structures.

== Measuring vertical thinking ==
Example of a standard MBTI grid

There are tests available that assess the characteristics that are associated with both vertical and lateral thinking styles. Some include:

=== Myers-Briggs Type Indicator ===
This personality assessment, also known as MBTI, evaluates personality types and functions. For example, the characteristics that relate to the vertical thinking/lateral thinking style that this test assesses, involves sensing versus intuition.

=== Styles of Learning and Thinking ===
This instrument, otherwise known as the SO-LAT, evaluates analytic versus holistic thinking styles. The analytic thinking mode can be compared to vertical thinking, whereas holistic thinking can be compared to lateral thinking.

=== Linear–Nonlinear Thinking Style Profile ===
Since there are no tests that measure nonlinear/linear thinking specifically, Vance, Groves, Paik, and Kindler created their own measure, the LNTSP, in 2007. This measure contains 74 items that evaluates the characteristics that are mostly associated with these thinking styles, additionally, it could be compared to the MBTI. Vertical thinking (linear thinking) focused on items that are associated with using analytic thinking, external data, and factual information. An example of an item used to measure linear thinking involves the phrase "I primarily weigh quantitative factors when making a decision about a large purchase or investment, such as my age, budget needs, or future earnings." Furthermore, the participants that answer questions like this on the LNTSP would do so using a likert scale.

== See also ==
- Logical reasoning – Process of drawing correct inferences
- Situation puzzle – Oral puzzle guessing game
- Design thinking – Processes by which design concepts are developed
- Myers–Briggs Type Indicator – Pseudoscientific personality questionnaire
