= Dayton Ward =

American science fiction writer

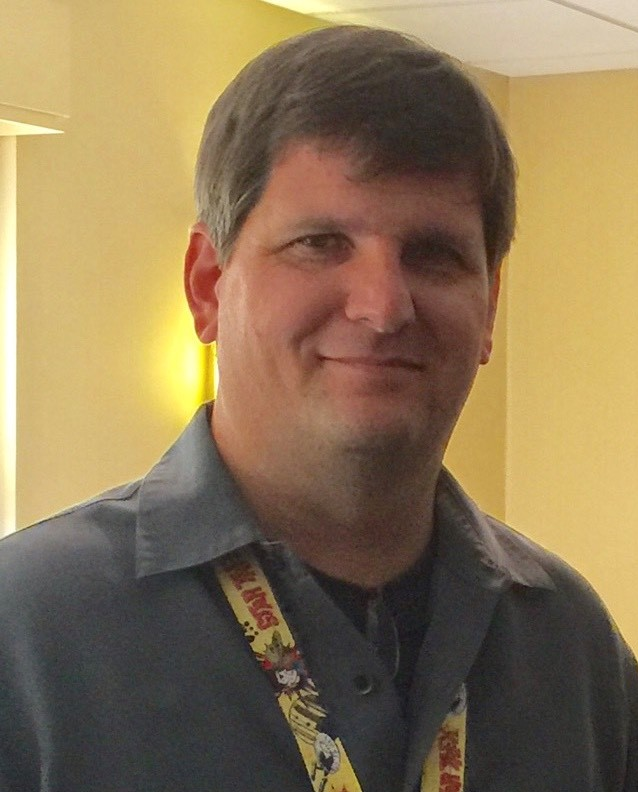
Dayton Ward at Shore Leave 38 convention, Hunt Valley, Maryland, 2016.

Dayton Ward (born June 7, 1967) is an American science fiction author primarily known for his Star Trek novels and short stories, which began with publication in the Strange New Worlds anthology series. He published stories in each of the first three Strange New Worlds volumes, making him the first author to render himself ineligible under the rules of that series. As such, future authors who achieved the same feat were said to have earned a "Wardy".

In addition, he has written numerous articles in Star Trek Communicator and Star Trek Magazine. He has also published a number of short stories in various magazines and collections. His frequent collaborator on these and other works is fellow author Kevin Dilmore.

Ward has been nominated six times for, and has won twice, the Scribe Award from the International Association of Media Tie-In Writers. The winning entries were Star Trek: The Next Generation: Armageddon's Arrow, in 2016, and Star Trek: Discovery: Drastic Measures, in 2019.

Ward was born and raised in Tampa, Florida. After graduating high school, Ward enlisted in the United States Marine Corps, where he worked in information systems. He was eventually stationed in Kansas City, Missouri. He served for more than eleven years, before being honorably discharged. He remained in and lives with his family in Kansas City. Ward worked as a software developer and part time writer before becoming a full time writer. He also consults for CBS on Star Trek licensee projects, including publications from Simon & Schuster and IDW Publishing.

== Bibliography ==
=== Star Trek ===
- Strange New Worlds I (July 1998)
  - "Reflections"
- Strange New Worlds II (May 1999)
  - "Almost...But Not Quite"
- Strange New Worlds III (May 2000)
  - "The Aliens Are Coming!"
- Starfleet Corps of Engineers (all with Kevin Dilmore)
  - #4: Interphase, Part 1 (March 2001)
  - #5: Interphase, Part 2 (April 2001)
  - #17: Foundations, Book 1 (July 2002)
  - #18: Foundations, Book 2 (August 2002)
  - #19: Foundations, Book 3 (September 2002)
  - #25: Home Fires (March 2003)
  - #39: Grand Designs (May 2004)
  - #44: Where Time Stands Still (October 2004)
  - #64: Distant Early Warning (May 2006)
  - Turn the Page (December 2006)
- Star Trek - #97: In the Name of Honor (January 2002)
- Star Trek: New Frontier - No Limits (October 2003)
  - "Loose Ends"
- Star Trek: The Next Generation- A Time to Sow (April 2004, with Kevin Dilmore)
- Star Trek: The Next Generation - A Time to Harvest (May 2004, with Kevin Dilmore)
- Star Trek - Tales of the Dominion War (August 2004)
  - "Field Expediency" (with Kevin Dilmore)
- Star Trek: Vanguard - Summon the Thunder (June 2006, with Kevin Dilmore)
- Star Trek - Constellations (September 2006)
  - "First, Do No Harm" (with Kevin Dilmore)
- Mere Anarchy
  - Book 1: Things Fall Apart (August 2006, with Kevin Dilmore)
- Star Trek: Mirror Universe - Glass Empires (February 2007)
  - Age of the Empress (with Mike Sussman and Kevin Dilmore)
- Star Trek: The Next Generation - The Sky's the Limit (October 2007)
  - "Acts of Compassion" (with Kevin Dilmore)
- Star Trek: Mirror Universe - Shards and Shadows (January 2009)
  - "Ill Winds"
- Star Trek: Vanguard - Open Secrets (May 2009, with Kevin Dilmore)
- Seven Deadly Sins (March 2010)
  - "The First Peer" (with Kevin Dilmore)
- Star Trek: Typhon Pact - #4: Paths of Disharmony (January 2011)
- Star Trek: Vanguard - Declassified (June 2011, with Kevin Dilmore)
- Star Trek: That Which Divides (March 2012, story with Kevin Dilmore)
- Star Trek: From History's Shadow (August 2013)
- Star Trek: The Fall: Peaceable Kingdoms (January 2014)
- Star Trek: The Next Generation: Armageddon's Arrow (June 2015)
- Star Trek: Elusive Salvation (May 2016)
- Star Trek: Vulcan (Hidden Universe Travel Guides) (July 2016)
- Star Trek: The Next Generation: Headlong Flight (February 2017)
- Star Trek: The Next Generation: Hearts and Minds (June 2017)
- Star Trek: The Klingon Empire (Hidden Universe Travel Guides) (July 2017)
- Star Trek: Discovery: Drastic Measures (February 2018)
- Star Trek: The Next Generation: Available Light (April 2019)
- Star Trek: Kirk Fu Manual: A Guide to Starfleet's Most Feared Martial Art (March 2020)
- Star Trek: Agents of Influence (June 2020)

=== Other ===
- Planet of the Apes: An Annotated Chronology (February 2001)
- Friend in Need (The World's Best Shortest Stories, April 2001)
- The Planet of the Apes Chronicles (contributor, August 2001)
- The Last World War (September 2003)
- Absent Friends (Kansas City Voices Magazine, November 2004)
- Enemy Unknown! (Rocket League, July 2005)
- The Genesis Protocol (February 2006)
- Getting Some Air (DZ Allen's Muzzle Flash, January 2007)
- Stayin' In Vegas (DZ Allen's Muzzle Flash, May 2007)
- Texas Pride: A Tale of The Last World War (Amazon Shorts Program, May 2007)
- Stop Loss (Down in the Cellar, June 2007)
- Jack and the Weird-Ass Box (Houston: We've Got Bubbas!, July 2007)
- Stayin' In Vegas, Part II (DZ Allen's Muzzle Flash, September 2007)
- Last Stand (Thug Works Magazine, October 2007)
- Stayin' In Vegas, Part III (DZ Allen's Muzzle Flash, November 2007)
- Wet Work (The 4400 novel, with Kevin Dilmore, November 2008)
- Fresh Perspective (Full-Throttle Space Tales Volume 3: Space Grunts) (May 2009)
- Counterstrike: The Last World War, Book 2 (April 2010)
- 24: Trial by Fire (September 2016)
- Footprints in the Stars (July 2019)
  - "Lost and Found"
