= Kevin Dilmore =

American novelist

Kevin Dilmore (born June 12, 1964) is an American newspaper reporter and long-time contributing writer to Star Trek Communicator Magazine before breaking into fiction writing. In addition to novels and short stories, both solo and with writing partner Dayton Ward, Kevin also contributed the author interviews in 2003's "Star Trek: Signature Collection" releases. Kevin currently lives in Kansas City, Missouri.

== Bibliography ==
=== Star Trek Fiction ===
- Interphase, Book One & Two (SCE eBook, 2001, with Dayton Ward)
- Foundations, Books One, Two & Three (SCE eBook, 2002, with Dayton Ward)
- "The Road to Edos" (NF short story, 2003)
- Home Fires (SCE eBook, 2003, with Dayton Ward)
- A Time to Sow (TNG novel, 2004, with Dayton Ward)
- A Time to Harvest (TNG novel, 2004, with Dayton Ward)
- "Field Expediency" (SCE short story, 2004, with Dayton Ward)
- Grand Designs (SCE eBook, 2004, with Dayton Ward)
- Where Time Stands Still (SCE eBook, 2004, with Dayton Ward)
- Distant Early Warning (SCE eBook, 2006, with Dayton Ward)
- Summon the Thunder (Vanguard novel, 2006, with Dayton Ward)
- "First, Do No Harm" (TOS short story, Constellations, 2006, with Dayton Ward)
- Mere Anarchy, Book One: Things Fall Apart (TOS eBook, 2006, with Dayton Ward)
- Turn the Page (CoE eBook, 2006, with Dayton Ward)
- Age of the Empress (ENT novel, Star Trek: Mirror Universe: Glass Empires, 2007, with Mike Sussman and Dayton Ward)
- "Acts of Compassion" (TNG short story, in the collection The Sky's the Limit, 2007, with Dayton Ward)

=== Other fiction ===
- Wet Work (The 4400 novel, with Dayton Ward, November 2008)
