= David Alan Mack =

American script- and fiction writer

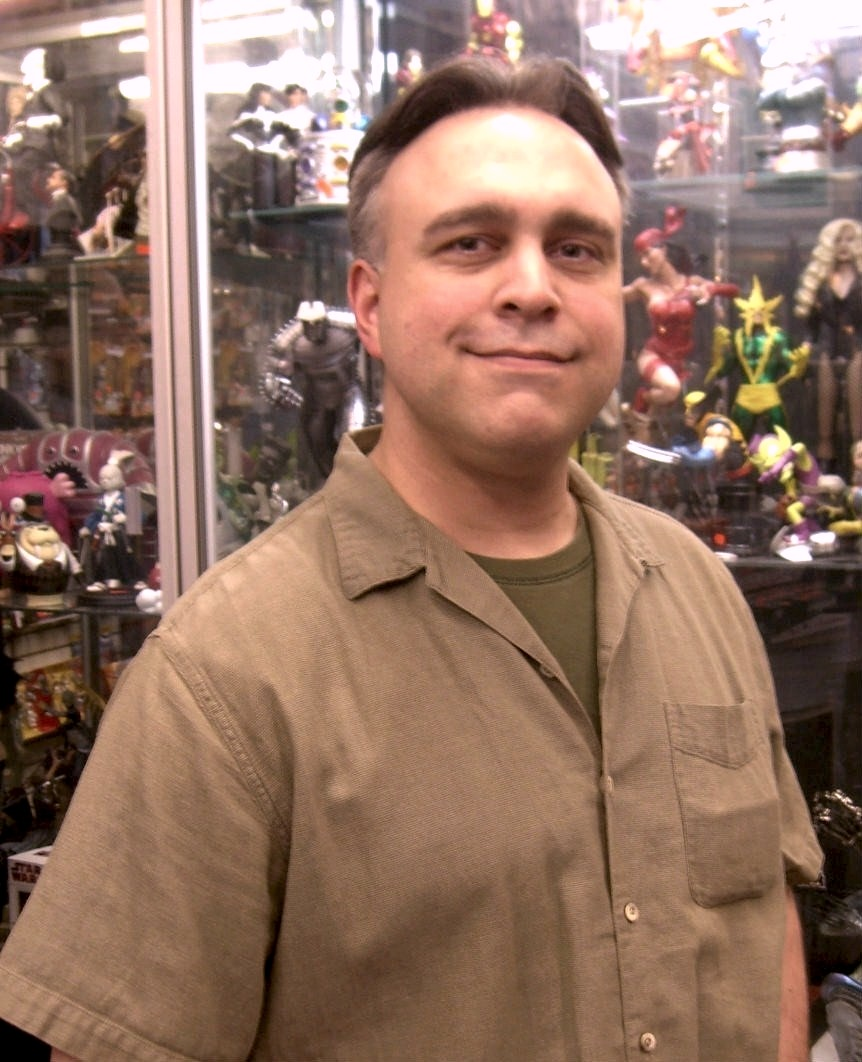
- Mack at Forbidden Planet in Manhattan, April 22, 2010
- Occupations: Novelist, screenwriter
- Writing career
- Period: 1995–present
- Genre: science fiction
- Notable works: Star Trek: Divided We Fall; Starfleet Corps of Engineers; Star Trek: New Frontier: No Limits

David Alan Mack is an American writer best known for his freelance Star Trek novels. Mack also has had a Star Trek script produced, and worked on a Star Trek comic book.

== Early career ==
Mack attended New York University Tisch School of the Arts as an undergraduate from 1987 to 1991. There he majored in film and television production and screenwriting as well as writing for the student-run comedy magazine, The Plague.

After receiving several rejections on early spec-script submissions to Star Trek: The Next Generation and Star Trek: Deep Space Nine, Mack teamed up with John J. Ordover, then an editor in Pocket Books' Star Trek Department. Working together, the pair combined Ordover's ability to arrange pitch meetings with the shows' producers with Mack's training in screenwriting.

In 1995, the pair made their first story sale, to Star Trek: Voyager, though the project was never produced. A few weeks later they made another sale, this time to Star Trek: Deep Space Nine, for the fourth-season episode "Starship Down". Another story pitched by the pair during that same meeting was bought three years later, as the basis for the seventh-season episode "It's Only a Paper Moon", for which the pair received a "story by" credit.

During the 1990s, Mack performed freelance editorial work for Pocket Books. That work led to Mack being invited to draft a 5,000-word supplement for John Vornholt's novel The Genesis Wave, Book One, which in turn earned Mack an invitation in 2000 to write his own first full-length Star Trek book.

Mack and Ordover wrote the four-part Deep Space Nine/Next Generation comic book miniseries Divided We Fall for WildStorm. With Keith R.A. DeCandido, Mack co-wrote the two-part Starfleet Corps of Engineers (SCE) e-book story Invincible.

== Solo work ==
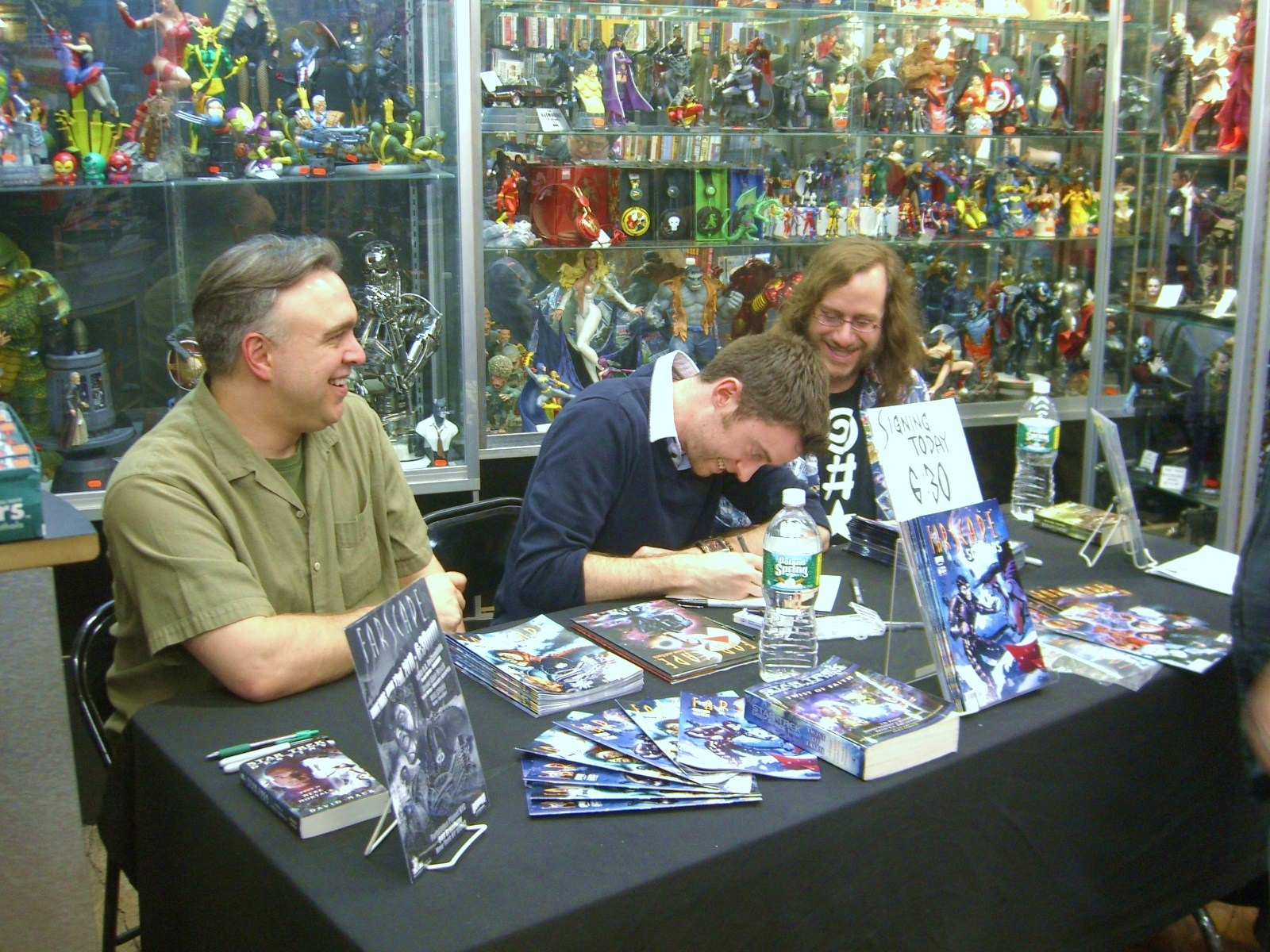
(From left to right:) Mack, Will Sliney and Keith DeCandido at a signing at Forbidden Planet in Manhattan, April 22, 2010

Mack's first solo project was the two-part SCE e-book novel Wildfire. His other SCE e-books are Failsafe and Small World. He next wrote the short stories "Waiting for G'Doh, or, How I Learned to Stop Moving and Hate People" for the anthology Star Trek: New Frontier: No Limits; and "Twilight's Wrath" for the anthology Star Trek: Tales of the Dominion War.

Mack's first direct-to-paperback novels were a Star Trek: The Next Generation duology: A Time To Kill and A Time To Heal. Mack also wrote Harbinger, the first volume of the Star Trek: Vanguard novel series, which he co-developed with editor Marco Palmieri.

His first non-Star Trek novel was the Wolverine spy-thriller Road of Bones, published in October 2006 by Pocket Books. His first original novel, The Calling, which he described as "a modern-day fantasy-thriller," was published in July 2009.

Other work includes the Star Trek: New Frontier minipedia, the Starfleet Survival Guide, the Star Trek: Deep Space Nine post-finale novel Warpath, the Mirror Universe short novel The Sorrows of Empire (first published in 2007, with an expanded version scheduled for release in 2010), and the multi-series crossover trilogy Star Trek: Destiny.

Subsequent books by Mack include Collateral Damage; More Beautiful Than Death, one of four novels based on the film Star Trek; and Zero Sum Game, a part of the Star Trek: Typhon Pact series following Star Trek: Destiny.

In July 2019, Mack revealed that he had been hired by CBS to be a consultant on the Star Trek TV series Star Trek: Lower Decks and a second animated Trek series whose title he indicated was still "classified" at the time. TrekMovie.com noted that Nickelodeon was developing an animated Trek series. That series, Star Trek: Prodigy, premiered on that network on October 28, 2021.

Mack has won the Scribe Award six times and in 2022 was elected Grandmaster of the International Association of Media Tie-In Writers.

== Bibliography ==
=== Print ===
- Star Trek: Divided We Fall (July–October 2001), four-issue comic-book miniseries, written with John J. Ordover. Published by WildStorm. Features characters from two television series, Star Trek: The Next Generation and Star Trek: Deep Space Nine.
- Invincible, Book 1 (September 2001). An e-book, co-written with Keith R. A. DeCandido. Part of the Starfleet Corps of Engineers series.
- Invincible, Book 2 (October 2001). An e-book, co-written with Keith R. A. DeCandido. Part of the Starfleet Corps of Engineers series.
- Star Trek: SCE, Book Two—Miracle Workers (February 2002), mass market paperback collection, contains the novella Invincible, written with Keith R. A. DeCandido, which was originally published as an eBook in 2001.
- Star Trek: The Starfleet Survival Guide (September 2002)(trade paperback). One of the Star Trek reference books.
- Wildfire, Book 1 and Book 2 (January 2003). An e-book in two parts, part of the Starfleet Corps of Engineers series.
- Star Trek: New Frontier—No Limits (October 2003), trade paperback anthology. It contains the short story "Waiting for G'Doh, or, How I Learned to Stop Moving and Hate People", featuring Zak Kebron.
- Failsafe (May 2004). An e-book, part of the Starfleet Corps of Engineers series.
- Star Trek: Tales of the Dominion War (August 2004), trade paperback anthology. Contains the short story "Twilight's Wrath", featuring Shinzon.
- Star Trek: The Next Generation—A Time to Kill (July 2004) (mass market paperback).
- Star Trek: The Next Generation—A Time to Heal (August 2004) (mass market paperback).
- Star Trek: SCE, Book Six—Wildfire(November 2004), mass market paperback collection. Contains the short novel Wildfire (originally published as an eBook, 2003). Part of the Starfleet Corps of Engineers series.
- Star Trek: Vanguard—Harbinger (2005) (mass market paperback)
- Wolverine—Road of Bones (2006) (mass market paperback)
- Star Trek: Deep Space Nine—Warpath (2006) (mass market paperback)
- Star Trek: Corps of Engineers—Creative Couplings (2007), trade paperback collection, contains novella Small World (originally published as an eBook, 2005)
- Star Trek: Vanguard—Reap the Whirlwind (May 2007), (mass market paperback)
- Star Trek: Corps of Engineers—Grand Designs (2007), trade paperback collection, contains the novella Failsafe (originally published as an eBook, 2004)
- Star Trek: Mirror Universe—Glass Empires (2007), trade paperback anthology, contains the short novel The Sorrows of Empire
- Star Trek Destiny
  1. Gods of Night (October 2008) mass market paperback
  2. Mere Mortals (November 2008) mass market paperback
  3. Lost Souls (December 2008) mass market paperback
- The 4400: Promises Broken (2009) (mass market paperback)
- The Calling (2009) (trade paperback)
- Star Trek: Vanguard—Precipice (November 2009) mass market paperback
- Star Trek: Typhon Pact—Zero Sum Game (October 2010) mass market paperback
- No Turning Back (November 2011) non-fiction, hardcover
- Star Trek: Mirror Universe—Rise Like Lions (December 2011) mass market paperback
- Star Trek: Vanguard—Storming Heaven (April 2012) mass market paperback
- Star Trek: The Next Generation—Cold Equations
  1. Persistence of Memory (October 2012) mass market paperback
  2. Silent Weapons (November 2012) mass market paperback
  3. The Body Electric (December 2012) mass market paperback
- Star Trek: The Fall—Book Three: A Ceremony of Losses (November 2013) mass market paperback
- 24: Rogue (September 2015) trade paperback
- Star Trek: Discovery—Desperate Hours (September 2017) mass market paperback
- Star Trek: Titan—Fortune of War (December 2017) mass market paperback
- Dark Arts series (original fiction)
  - The Midnight Front (January 2018) hardcover
  - The Iron Codex (January 2019) hardcover
  - The Shadow Commission (August 2020) trade paperback
- Collateral Damage (Star Trek: The Next Generation) (October 2019) paperback

=== Television ===
- Star Trek: Deep Space Nine—"It's Only a Paper Moon" (1999), with John Ordover and Ronald D. Moore
- Star Trek: Deep Space Nine—"Starship Down" (1995), with John Ordover

=== Interactive media ===
- Star Trek: Deep Space Nine—Dominion Wars (2001), CD-ROM game (voice-over scripts)
- Star Trek: Deep Space Nine—The Fallen (2000), CD-ROM game (interactive dialogue scripts, dialogue polishing)
- Star Trek—Starship Creator (1998), CD-ROM Simulator (character development)

=== Podcast ===
- Star Trek: Khan (2025) Nine part podcast focussed on Khan Noonien Sighn, written with Kirsten Beyer. Winner of Scribe Award in 2026 in the Best Audio category.
