= A Time to Heal =

A Time to Heal is a quotation from the Bible (Ecclesiastes 3).

It may refer to:

- A Time to Heal (film), a 1994 television film
- A Time to Heal (Star Trek), a 2004 novel by David Mack set in the fictional universe of Star Trek: The Next Generation
- A Time to Heal, the 1979 autobiography of U.S. President Gerald Ford
