= A Time to Be Born =

A Time to Be Born may refer to:

- A Time to Be Born, a novel in the Star Trek: A Time to... series
- A Time to Be Born, a novel by Dawn Powell
- A Time to Be Born (musical), 2006, based on the Dawn Powell novel
