= Summon the Thunder =

2006 novel by Dayton Ward

- Author: Dayton Ward; Kevin Dilmore
- Language: English
- Genre: Science fiction novel
- Publisher: Pocket Books
- Publication date: 27 June 2006
- Publication place: United States
- Media type: Print (Paperback)
- Pages: 432
- ISBN: 1-4165-2400-2
- OCLC: 67872664
- LC Class: CPB Box no. 2703 vol. 17
- Preceded by: Harbinger

Summon the Thunder is the second novel in the Star Trek: Vanguard series revolving around the Federation Starbase 47, otherwise known as Vanguard.

== Synopsis ==
The Shedai, an ancient race of beings, threaten the lives of all aboard Vanguard.
