= Divergent thinking =

Process of generating creative ideas

Divergent thinking is a thought process used to generate creative ideas by exploring many possible solutions. It typically occurs in a spontaneous, free-flowing, "non-linear" manner, such that many ideas are generated in an emergent cognitive fashion. Many possible solutions are explored in a short amount of time, and unexpected connections are drawn. Divergent thinking is often contrasted with convergent thinking. Convergent thinking is the opposite of divergent thinking as it organizes and structures ideas and information, which follows a particular set of logical steps to arrive at one solution, which in some cases is a "correct" solution.

The psychologist J. P. Guilford coined the terms convergent thinking and divergent thinking in 1956.

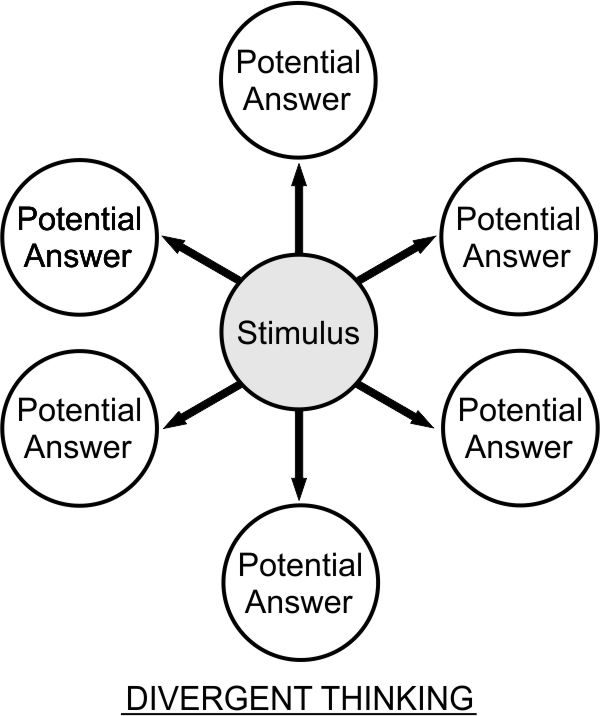
A map of how divergent thinking works

== Activities ==
Activities which promote divergent thinking include creating lists of questions, setting aside time for thinking and meditation, brainstorming, subject mapping, bubble mapping, keeping a journal, playing tabletop role-playing games, creating artwork, and free writing.

== Divergent vs convergent thinking ==
Convergent thinking is the process of finding one solution. Divergent thinking involves more creativity, and is typically regarded as spontaneous. In other words, convergent thinking involves more logical thinking with the aim of finding the most efficient solution. Divergent thinking is more useful for brainstorming to explore multiple potential solutions, with less focus on immediate practicality.

Benefits of convergent thinking:

- No room for vagueness or uncertainty
- Organization and structure
- Quick resolutions

Benefits of divergent thinking:

- New opportunities
- Allows for creativity to flow
- Multiple perspectives

== Divergent thinking and society ==
Parallels have been drawn between playfulness in kindergarten-aged children and divergent thinking. Pier-Luc Chantal, Emilie Gagnon-St-Pierre, and Henry Markovits of Université du Quebec à Montréal conducted a study on preschool-aged children in which the relationship between divergent thinking and deductive reasoning were observed.

Guila Fusi, Sara Lavolpe, Nara Crepaldi, and Maria Lusia Rusconi conducted a systematic review on the effect of age on divergent thinking. They found that the relationship between age and DT abilities is not at all linear, but "complex and multidimensional."

While little research has been conducted on the impact of sleep deprivation on divergent thinking, one study by J. A. Horne illustrated that even when motivation to perform well is maintained, sleep can still impact divergent thinking performance.

== Divergent thinking and mental health ==
Divergent thinking has been associated with a more positive mood and a higher incidence of both positive and negative mind wandering.

=== Divergent thinking and psychopathology ===
Divergent thinking can be counterproductive when used excessively. Schizophrenia could be partially seen as a variation of extreme divergent thinking since both are characterized by disorganized actions and thoughts.

=== Therapeutic value of divergent thinking ===
The ability for divergent thinking can promote active coping strategies such as a positive reappraisal in young adults and thus serve as a prophylaxis for hopelessness that is generally related to depressed mood, according to a study by Bennliure and Moral.

== Effects of positive and negative mood ==
In a study at the University of Bergen, Norway, the effects of positive and negative mood on divergent thinking were examined. Nearly two hundred art and psychology students participated, first by measuring their moods with an adjective checklist before performing the required tasks. The results showed a clear distinction in performance between those with a self-reported positive versus negative mood:

Results showed natural positive mood to facilitate significantly task performance and negative mood to inhibit it… The results suggest that persons in elevated moods may prefer satisficing strategies, which would lead to a higher number of proposed solutions. Persons in a negative mood may choose optimizing strategies and be more concerned with the quality of their ideas, which is detrimental to performance on this kind of task.

— (Vosburg, 1998)

A series of related studies suggested a link between positive mood and the promotion of cognitive flexibility. In a 1990 study by Murray, Sujan, Hirt and Sujan, this hypothesis was examined more closely and they "found positive mood participants were able to see relations between concepts", as well as demonstrating advanced abilities "in distinguishing the differences between concepts".

== Divergent thinking modeling ==
Both convergent and divergent processing have been subject to modeling. The first process has been modeled by emulating responses to the Remote Associates Test (RAT) by Olteţeanu and Falomir (2015) and Klein and Badia (2015). The RAT was modeled by both research teams as a proof-of-concept to investigate how remote associative concepts relate to statistically based Natural Language Processing techniques and how these connections relate to the convergent and divergent cognitive processes involved in creativity. According to Klein and Badia, distant associates are tracked down and chosen using a strictly lexical-based modeling technique, where both the frequency of co-occurrence and the frequency of each term in the corpus are valued in the convergent and divergent parts of the process.

On a more divergent focus, Klein and Badia (2022), and Olteţeanu and Falomir (2016) proposed a divergent thinking emulation by modeling the Alternative Uses Task (AUT). The former researchers proposed a simple co-occurrence based method with and without grammatical labeling to solve this test. The later applied what they named Object Replacement and Object Composition with specific reference to AUT. Other ideas for DT generation, include Veale and Li (2016) template approach, and López-Ortega (2013) who proposed an application of divergent exploration in a multi agent system.

== See also ==
- Lateral thinking – Manner of solving problems
