= Mackenzie Calhoun =

- Star Trek character
- Captain Mackenzie Calhoun, flanked by his mentor Jean-Luc Picard and Ambassador Spock, on the cover of the 1997 novel, Star Trek: New Frontier: House of Cards. Art by Keith Birdsong.

In-universe information
- Species: Xenexian
- Affiliation: United Federation of Planets; Starfleet
- Posting: USS Grissom, First Officer; USS Excalibur, Captain
- Rank: Captain

Mackenzie Calhoun (born M'k'n'zy of Calhoun) is a fictional character from the Star Trek universe. Created by Peter David, Calhoun is an extraterrestrial from the planet Xenex, and is captain of the Federation starship USS Excalibur.

Calhoun appears primarily in Star Trek: New Frontier, a series of spin-off novels and comic books set during the 24th century era of Star Trek: The Next Generation, in which he is the main character. He first appeared in the 1997 New Frontier debut novel, Star Trek: New Frontier: House of Cards.

Calhoun is the only Star Trek character that has not appeared in any of the Star Trek television series or movies to have an action figure.

== Publication history ==
In 1997 Pocket Books introduced Star Trek: New Frontier, a novel series written by Peter David that featured a combination of original characters and recurring, supporting characters from the television series Star Trek: The Next Generation and its spinoffs. The series is centered upon the U.S.S. Excalibur, a starship of the United Federation of Planets, which is commanded by the series' star, Captain Mackenzie Calhoun. The series was a popular success, and led to New Frontier comic books and appearances in Star Trek video games and action figures.

== Fictional character history ==
Calhoun is born M'k'n'zy of Calhoun on the planet Xenex, in the city of Calhoun. He grows up under the brutal rule of the Danteri, who occupied his world. As a child, M'k'n'zy witnesses the public execution of his father in a town square by Falkar of Danter, which spurs him to grow into a rebel warlord. He kills his first person at age 14, and is given command of a strike vessel that marked the beginning of the Xenexian rebellion. By the time M'k'n'zy is 20, he liberates Xenex. Shortly after doing so, he fathers a son, Xyon, with Catrine, a woman from the Calhoun clan whose husband had died, as she requests as part of Xenexian culture.

Calhoun encounters Jean-Luc Picard, who, while commanding the USS Stargazer, visits Xenex as a representative of the United Federation of Planets to assist in negotiations between Xenex and Danter. Picard convinced Calhoun to join Starfleet, the scientific and defensive arm of the Federation. Calhoun leaves Xenex, a move which rouses the ire of many of his people, to enter Starfleet Academy, where he meets Elizabeth Shelby, who would become his lover, rival and, eventually, fiancée. Their engagement ends after Calhoun took the Kobayashi Maru test.

As a Starfleet officer, Calhoun served aboard the USS Grissom, where he meets Katarina "Kat" Mueller, who would become his lover. It was on the Grissom that he learns to play poker, and establishes a reputation for being able to bluff his way through any hand, even evading an empath's attempt to get a bead on him. Calhoun was present during a catastrophic event aboard the Grissom, which led to his apparent departure from Starfleet. In reality, he becomes an undercover operative for head of Starfleet Intelligence Admiral Alynna Nechayev who, years afterward, fearing Calhoun was getting "too deep" into the lifestyle of the thugs and criminals he was associating with, pulled him out and gave him his own starship to command, the USS Excalibur. It was in taking this command that he is reunited with both Shelby, who was now his First Officer, and Mueller, whom he picked as his Executive Officer (the terms are normally synonymous on the various television series, but in the New Frontier novels, a First Officer heads the ship's day shift, while the Executive Officer commands the night shift watch). Calhoun is assigned to Sector 221-G, the area of space of the former Thallonian Empire, which has collapsed, resulting in destabilization of the region.

Calhoun makes an appearance in the 2007 Star Trek: The Next Generation novel Before Dishonor by Peter David. In the novel, Calhoun encounters Picard en route to Sector 001 to defend Earth against a new Borg threat.

Calhoun's older brother, D’ndai, dies during an alien invasion of his homeworld, Xenex, in the 2011 novel Blind Man's Bluff.

== Personality and appearance ==
Calhoun is depicted as intelligent, cunning, canny, resourceful and sneaky. His success as a tactician is due in part to his ability to sense imminent danger, and anticipate his enemies' moves. As a young rebel, he trained himself to control his respiration, heartbeat and pulse in order to make himself a more efficient killer, though Peter David has explicitly made it unclear whether this ability is common to Xenexians or unique to Calhoun.

Edward Jellico sees Calhoun as an unpredictable maverick and a cowboy, and Jean-Luc Picard has observed that reverence was never one of Calhoun's strong suits. Calhoun feels that, deep down, he is a savage, and that any appearance of civilization on his part is a façade that he wears like a cloak, though he keeps the scar Falkar gave him as a reminder of his roots. Calhoun has commented on his personality thus: "I’m an officer. I’m just not a gentleman."

Like all Xenexians, Calhoun resembles a human almost entirely, with the exception of his purple eyes. His skin has a leathery, burnished texture, the years of hardship he endured early in life having given him a weathered look, with several deep creases already lining his forehead by the time he was 19. Calhoun has a scar down the right side of his face from his right temple down across his cheek, left by the wound Falkar inflicted on him with his short sword in 2353. He is a head shorter than his older brother, D'ndai. The renditions of Calhoun on the New Frontier novel covers, and in the comic book Double Time, consistently depict him as resembling a Caucasian human male with dark brown hair, though it appears as black in Turnaround.

The Mirror Universe Mac, who first appears in "Cutting Ties", a story in the 2007 anthology Star Trek Mirror Universe: Obsidian Alliances, is described as having black hair, and appears thus in Turnaround. Whereas our universe's Calhoun has a scar down the right side of his face, the mirror Calhoun has one down the left side of his. Mac spent a year on Romulus educating himself in areas such as philosophy, war strategy, and chess. He learned to defend himself during his many years in the Reman mines.

== Influences ==
Fans have noted the similarity between Calhoun and another of Peter David's Star Trek characters, Commander Quintin Stone from David's 1991 TNG novel, A Rock and a Hard Place. David explained that Calhoun was not intentionally a remodeled Stone, but that both were based to some extent by characters portrayed by film actor Mel Gibson: the apparently unstable "cowboy diplomat" Stone was based on Martin Riggs from the Lethal Weapon films, and Calhoun, who was a rebel leader at 20, was inspired by the Scottish rebel leader William Wallace from Braveheart. David has added that Calhoun is closer to the historical Wallace, in that like Calhoun, Wallace was much younger than the real-life Gibson was when he portrayed Wallace in the movie.

In addition, Calhoun, who is depicted as something of a cowboy, has been compared by other characters in the stories to James T. Kirk, as in a conversation with Edward Jellico in the novel Martyr. David has stated that on his blog that Calhoun indeed looks up to and identifies with Kirk, seeing himself very much in the cowboy mold that Kirk personified.

== In other media ==
Playmates Toys produced a limited edition Captain Calhoun 4.5 inch action figure which was available only via mail order through the Star Trek Communicator fan club magazine, and began shipping in September 1998. Approximately 10,000 of these figures were produced.

In September 2005, Calhoun made a cameo appearance in "Vigil", a sixth-season episode of the Star Trek fan film series Star Trek: Hidden Frontier, in which he meets his old lover, Elizabeth Shelby, now commanding the Excelsior, in the Briar Patch. Calhoun was played by James Cawley, producer and star of Star Trek: New Voyages, in which he plays James T. Kirk. Peter David stated on his blog that although the creators of the episode did not check with him beforehand, he thought it was very entertaining.

In the online game Star Trek Online, Calhoun is a Starfleet mission contact based on Starbase K-7. He issues PvP missions to Federation players so they can fight other STO players playing the Klingon faction.
