= Synthetic thinking =

Synthetic thinking is a form of thinking that uses the function of a phenomenon within a larger system to explain it. This is in contrast to analytical thinking, which instead divides the system into smaller parts that are more easily explained. An example of synthetic thinking is explaining the organs of the human body in terms of the role they play in the organism, as opposed to analytical thinking which looks at the behavior of its individual tissues or structures. Synthetic thinking can also be useful for making summaries or conclusions.

Synthetic thinking has been described as the ability to "see problems in new ways and abandon established mindsets", and has been associated with the metaphor of thinking outside the box which means thinking differently, unconventionally, or from a new perspective.

== See also ==
- Bottom-up and top-down approaches, strategies for information processing and knowledge organization
- Intuitive thinking, form of thinking characterized by the use of intuition or "gut feeling"
