= Thinking outside the box =

Metaphor for unconventional thinking

Thinking outside the box (also thinking beyond the box and, especially in Australia, thinking outside the square) is an idiom that means to think differently, unconventionally, or from a new perspective. The phrase also often refers to novel or creative thinking.

== History ==
The origin of the phrase is unclear. "Think beyond the boundary"-metaphors, that is, metaphors that allude to think differently or with less constraints, seem to have an old history. For example, an 1888 news story in The Annual Register describes a British political party as not venturing to think outside the lines of its leader.

The "nine dots" puzzle (left) has the goal of linking all 9 dots using four straight lines or less, without lifting the pen. Its solution (right) is to draw those lines "outside the box".

Since at least 1954, the nine dots puzzle has been used as a metaphor of the type "think beyond the boundary". Early phrasings include go outside the dots (1954), breakthrough thinking that gets outside the nine-dot square (1959), and what are the actual boundaries of the problem? (1963). Norman Vincent Peale writes about this puzzle in a 1969 article for the Chicago Tribune, quote:

There is one particular puzzle you may have seen. It's a drawing of a box with some dots in it, and the idea is to connect all the dots by using only four lines. You can work on that puzzle, but the only way to solve it is to draw the lines so they connect outside the box. It's so simple once you realize the principle behind it. But if you keep trying to solve it inside the box, you'll never be able to master that particular puzzle.

That puzzle represents the way a lot of people think. They get caught up inside the box of their own lives. You've got to approach any problem objectively. Stand back and see it for exactly what it is. From a little distance, you can see it a lot more clearly. Try and get a different perspective, a fresh point of view. Step outside the box your problem has created within you and come at it from a different direction.

All of a sudden, just like the puzzle, you'll see how to handle your problem. And just like the four lines that connect all the dots, you'll discover the course of action that's just right in order to set your life straight.

In 1970, the phrase think outside the dots appears without mentioning the nine dots puzzle.

Finally, in 1971, the specific phrase think outside the box is attested, again appearing together with the nine dots puzzle. In 1976, the phrase is used in England and 1978 in the USA, both without mentioning the nine dots puzzle.

Beyond the above attestations, there are several unconfirmed accounts of how the phrase got introduced. According to Martin Kihn, it goes back to management consultants in the 1970s and 1980s challenging their clients to solve the "nine dots" puzzle. According to John Adair, he introduced the nine dots puzzle in 1969, from which the saying comes. It is claimed that the use of the nine-dot puzzle in consultancy circles stems from the corporate culture of the Walt Disney Company, where the puzzle was used in-house.

== See also ==
- Egg of Columbus
- Einstellung effect
- Eureka effect
- Functional fixedness
- Gordian Knot
- Kobayashi Maru
- Lateral thinking
- Synthetic thinking, form of thinking that uses the function of a phenomenon within a larger system to explain it
