= John Vornholt =

American novelist

- Born: John Blair Vornholt; February 14, 1951 (age 75); Marion, Ohio, U.S.
- Occupations: Author; screenwriter; playwright; journalist
- Spouse: Nancy Vornholt
- Children: 2 children

John Blair Vornholt (born February 14, 1951) is an American author, screenwriter and journalist.

As an author, he has written numerous media tie-ins, including many Star Trek novels. As a screenwriter, he worked on several animated children's series of the 1980s, including Ghostbusters, Dennis the Menace and Beverly Hills Teens. As a journalist, he has worked as lead writer for The Hollywood Reporter and Tucson Weekly.

== Bibliography ==
=== Original works ===
- The Troll King
- The Troll Queen
- The Troll Treasure
- The First Third (play)
- How To Sneak Into The Girls’ Locker Room
- The Fabulist (1993)

=== Babylon 5 ===
- Book One Voices
- Book Three Blood Oath

=== Buffy and Angel ===
- Coyote Moon
- Seven Crows

=== Dinotopia ===
- Riverquest
- Sabertooth Mountain
- Dolphin Watch

=== Final Fantasy ===
- Final Fantasy: The Spirits Within (YA version)

=== Flight 29 Down ===
- The Seven
- The Return

=== Marvel ===
- Spider-Man: Valley Of The Lizard

=== Primal Rage ===
- The Avatars

=== Star Trek ===
- Masks
- Contamination
- Sanctuary
- War Drums
- Star Trek Generations
- Capture the Flag
- Antimatter
- Rogue Saucer
- Aftershock
- Crossfire
- Star Trek: First Contact
- Mind Meld
- Behind Enemy Lines
- Tunnel Through the Stars
- Star Trek: Insurrection
- Quarantine
- Gemworld, Book One
- Gemworld, Book Two
- The Captain and the King
- The Genesis Wave series
- Star Trek: Nemesis
- Genesis Force
- A Time to Be Born
- A Time to Die

== Filmography ==
- 1986 - Ghostbusters
- 1986 - Dennis the Menace
- 1987 - Beverly Hills Teens
- 1987 - Dinosaucers
- 1987 - Sylvanian Families
- 1988 - A Whole Lotta Fun
- 1990 - The Adventures of Super Mario Bros. 3
- 1990 - The New Adventures of He-Man
