= Star Trek: Vanguard =

Series of fiction novels

- Cover art of Harbinger
- Author: Various
- Country: United States
- Language: English
- Genre: Science fiction
- Publisher: Pocket Books
- Published: 2005–2012
- Media type: Print (Paperback)
- No. of books: 9
- Followed by: Star Trek: Seekers

Star Trek: Vanguard is a series of Star Trek tie-in fiction novels set during the 2260s, or the time period concurrent with Star Trek: The Original Series. The series is written by Kevin Dilmore, David Mack, and Dayton Ward.

Distant Early Warning (2006), a Star Trek: Corps of Engineers novella by Dayton Ward and Kevin Dilmore, is a prequel to Vanguard, introducing the setting and several characters. Star Trek: Seekers (2014–15), also written by Dilmore, Mack, and Ward, is a sequel series.

== Setting ==
The books largely take place on board the Federation space station Starbase 47, also known as Vanguard, which serves as a support facility for a colonization push by the United Federation of Planets into an interstellar expanse called the Taurus Reach. While the station does in fact help colonies across the area, its true mission (known only to a few people) is to study a mystery that began with the discovery of genetically engineered DNA millions of times more complex than any previously encountered, known as the Taurus Meta-Genome.

In its effort to understand the Meta-Genome, Starbase 47 has three vessels permanently assigned to it, the Constitution-class cruiser USS Endeavour, the tiny Archer-class scout USS Sagittarius, and the Daedalus-class Starfleet Corps of Engineers starship USS Lovell. Another starship, the USS Bombay, was destroyed during the events of Harbinger. In addition to the mission, those who know of Vanguard's true nature must also prevent others from becoming aware of the situation, especially the Klingon Empire and the Tholian Assembly, both of whom have interests in the region and are suspicious of the Federation's presence.

While the majority of the characters featured in the first novels are original to this series, the Vulcan lieutenant commander T'Prynn appeared in two other Star Trek novels—the Lost Era novel The Art of the Impossible by Keith DeCandido, and Deep Space Nine novels Lesser Evil, by Robert Simpson, and Unity, by S. D. Perry. In addition, petty officer Razka (from the third novel Reap the Whirlwind) first appears in The Next Generation novel A Time to Kill by David Mack, and Carol Marcus from The Wrath of Khan appears at the end of the same novel.

== Novels ==
Declassified (2011) is an anthology of four novellas. In Tempest's Wake (2012) was published as an ebook exclusive.

No.	Title	Author(s)	Date	ISBN
1	Harbinger	David Mack	26 July 2005	1-4165-0774-4
2	Summon the Thunder	Dayton Ward and Kevin Dilmore	27 June 2006	1-4165-2400-2
3	Reap the Whirlwind	David Mack	22 May 2007	978-1-4165-3414-3
4	Open Secrets	Dayton Ward	28 April 2009	978-1-4165-4792-1
5	Precipice	David Mack	24 November 2009	978-1-4391-3011-7
6	Declassified (anthology)	Dayton Ward, Kevin Dilmore, Marco Palmieri, and David Mack.	28 June 2011	978-1-4516-0691-1
7	What Judgements Come	Dayton Ward and Kevin Dilmore	27 September 2011	978-1-4516-0863-2
8	Storming Heaven	David Mack	27 March 2012	978-1-4516-5070-9
—	In Tempest's Wake (ebook)	Dayton Ward	2 October 2012	978-1-4516-9589-2

=== Seekers (2014–15) ===
Star Trek: Seekers is a continuation of Vanguard.

No.	Title	Author(s)	Date	ISBN
1	Second Nature	David Mack	22 July 2014	978-1-4767-5307-2
2	Point of Divergence	Dayton Ward and Kevin Dilmore	26 August 2014	978-1-4767-5726-1
3	Long Shot	David Mack	28 July 2015	978-1-4767-5309-6
4	All That's Left	Dayton Ward and Kevin Dilmore	27 October 2015	978-1-4767-9860-8

== Related novels ==
Novels that include Vanguard characters and settings.

Title	Author(s)	Date	ISBN
The Wrath of Khan (novelization) (Star Trek, Book 7)	Vonda N. McIntyre	July 1982	0-671-45610-5
Lesser Evil (Deep Space Nine)	Robert Simpson	October 29, 2002	0-7434-1024-6
The Art of the Impossible (The Lost Era, Book 3)	Keith DeCandido	September 30, 2003	0-7434-6405-2
Unity (Deep Space Nine)	S.D. Perry	November 18, 2003	0-7434-4840-5
A Time to Kill (The Next Generation)	David Mack	July 27, 2004	0-7434-9177-7
Distant Early Warning (Corps of Engineers, Book 64)	Dayton Ward and Kevin Dilmore	June 1, 2006	1-4165-3309-5
Paths of Disharmony (Typhon Pact)	Dayton Ward	January 25, 2011	978-1-4391-6083-1

== See also ==
- List of Star Trek novels
