= Convergent thinking =

Ability to answer questions correctly without the need for novel ideas

Convergent thinking is a term coined by Joy Paul Guilford as the opposite of divergent thinking. It generally means the ability to give the "correct" answer to questions that do not require novel ideas, for instance on standardized multiple-choice tests for intelligence.

== Relevance ==
A Map of how Convergent Thinking Works

Convergent thinking is the type of thinking that focuses on coming up with the single, well-established answer to a problem. It is oriented toward deriving the single best, or most often correct answer to a question. Convergent thinking emphasizes speed, accuracy, and logic and focuses on recognizing the familiar, reapplying techniques, and accumulating stored information. It is most effective in situations where an answer readily exists and simply needs to be either recalled or worked out through decision making strategies. A critical aspect of convergent thinking is that it leads to a single best answer, leaving no room for ambiguity. In this view, answers are either right or wrong. The solution that is derived at the end of the convergent thinking process is the best possible answer the majority of the time.

Convergent thinking is also linked to knowledge as it involves manipulating existing knowledge by means of standard procedures. Knowledge is another important aspect of creativity. It is a source of ideas, suggests pathways to solutions, and provides criteria of effectiveness and novelty. Convergent thinking is used as a tool in creative problem solving. When an individual is using critical thinking to solve a problem they consciously use standards or probabilities to make judgments. This contrasts with divergent thinking where judgment is deferred while looking for and accepting many possible solutions.

Convergent thinking is often used in conjunction with divergent thinking. Divergent thinking typically occurs in a spontaneous, free-flowing manner, where many creative ideas are generated and evaluated. Multiple possible solutions are explored in a short amount of time, and unexpected connections are drawn. After the process of divergent thinking has been completed, ideas and information are organized and structured using convergent thinking to decision making strategies are used leading to a single-best, or most often correct answer. Examples of divergent thinking include using brainstorming, free writing and creative thinking at the beginning of the problem solving process to generate possible solutions that can be evaluated later. Once a sufficient number of ideas have been explored, convergent thinking can be used. Knowledge, logic, probabilities and other decision-making strategies are taken into consideration as the solutions are evaluated individually in a search for a single best answer which when reached is unambiguous.

== Convergent vs. divergent thinking ==
=== Personality ===
The personality correlates of divergent and convergent thinking have been studied. Results indicate that many personality traits are associated with divergent thinking (e.g., ideational fluency). Two of the most commonly identified correlates are Openness and Extraversion, which have been found to facilitate divergent thinking production. Openness assesses intellectual curiosity, imagination, artistic interests, liberal attitudes, and originality. See Divergent thinking page for further details.

The fact that Openness was found to be one of the strongest personality correlate of divergent thinking is not surprising, as previous studies have suggested that Openness be interpreted as a proxy of creativity. Although Openness conceptualizes individual differences in facets other than creativity, the high correlation between Openness and divergent thinking is indicative of two different ways of measuring the same aspects of creativity. Openness is a self-report of one's preference for thinking "outside the box". Divergent thinking tests represent a performance-based measure of such.

While some studies have found no personality effects on convergent thinking, large-scale meta-analyses have found numerous personality traits to be related to such reasoning abilities (e.g., corrected r = .31 with openness and -.30 with the volatility aspect of neuroticism).

=== Brain activity ===
The changes in brain activity were studied in subjects during both convergent and divergent thinking. To do this, researchers studied Electroencephalography (EEG) patterns of subjects during convergent and divergent thinking tasks. Different patterns of change for the EEG parameters were found during each type of thinking. When compared with a control group who was resting, both convergent and divergent thinking produced significant desynchronization of the Alpha 1,2 rhythms. Meanwhile, convergent thinking induced coherence increases in the Theta 1 band that was more caudal and right-sided. On the other hand, divergent thinking demonstrated amplitude decreases in the caudal regions of the cortex in Theta 1 and 2 bands. The large increase in amplitude and coherence indicates a close synchronization between both hemispheres in the brain.

The successful generation of the hypothesis during divergent thinking performance seems to induce positive emotions which, in part, can be due to the increase of complexity and performance measures of creative thinking, Psycho-inter-hemispheric coherence. Finally, the obtained dominance of the right hemisphere and 'the cognitive axis', the coupling of the left occipital – right frontal in contrast to the right occipital – left frontal 'axis' characterizing analytic thinking, may reflect the EEG pattern of the unconscious mental processing during successful divergent thinking.

Convergent and divergent thinking depend on the locus coeruleus neurotransmission system, which modulates noradrenaline levels in the brain. This system plays important roles in cognitive flexibility and the explore/exploit tradeoff problem (multi-armed bandit problem).

=== Intellectual ability ===
A series of standard intelligence tests were used to measure both the convergent and divergent thinking abilities of adolescents. Results indicate that subjects who classified as high on divergent thinking had significantly higher word fluency and reading scores than subjects who classified as low on divergent thinking. Furthermore, those who were high in divergent thinking also demonstrated higher anxiety and penetration scores. Thus, those subjects who are high in divergent thinking can be characterized as having their perceptual processes mature and become adequately controlled in an unconventional way.

Conversely, subjects in the high convergent thinking group illustrated higher grade averages for the previous school year, less difficulty with homework and also indicated that their parents pressed them towards post-secondary education. These were the only significant relationships regarding the convergent thinking measures. This suggests that these cognitive dimensions are independent of one another. Future investigations into this topic should focus more upon the developmental, cognitive and perpetual aspects of personality among divergent and convergent thinkers, rather than their attitude structures.

=== Creative ability ===
Creative ability was measured in a study using convergent tasks, which require a single correct answer, and divergent tasks, which requires producing many different answers of varying correctness. Two types of convergent tasks were used, the first being remote associative tasks, which gave the subject three words and asked what word the previous three words are related to. The second type of convergent thinking task were insight problems, which gave the subjects some contextual facts and then asked them a question requiring interpretation.

For the remote associates tasks, the convergent thinkers correctly solved more of the five remote associates problems than did those using divergent thinking. This was demonstrated to be significantly different by a one-way ANOVA. In addition, when responding to insight problems, participants using convergent thinking solved more insight problems than did the control group, however, there was no significant difference between subjects using convergent or divergent thinking.

For the divergent thinking tasks, although together all of the divergent tasks demonstrated a correlation, they were not significant when examined between conditions.

=== Mood ===
With increasing evidence suggesting that emotions can affect underlying cognitive processes, recent approaches have also explored the opposite, that cognitive processes can also affect one's mood. Research indicates that preparing for a creative thinking task induces mood swings depending on what type of thinking is used for the task.

The results demonstrate that carrying out a task requiring creative thinking does have an effect on one's mood. This provides considerable support for the idea that mood and cognition are not only related, but also that this relation is reciprocal. Additionally, divergent and convergent thinking impact mood in opposite ways. Divergent thinking led to a more positive mood, whereas convergent thinking had the opposite effect, leading to a more negative mood.

== Practical use ==
Multiple choice questions requiring convergent thinking

Convergent thinking is a fundamental tool in a child's education. Today, most educational opportunities are tied to one's performance on standardized tests that are often multiple choice in nature. When a student contemplates the possible answers available, they use convergent thinking to weigh alternatives within a construct. This allows one to find a single best solution that is measurable.

Examples of convergent questions in teaching in the classroom:

- On reflecting over the entirety of the play Hamlet, what were the main reasons why Ophelia went mad?
- What is the chemical reaction for photosynthesis?
- What are signs of nitrogen deficiency in plants?
- Which breeds of livestock would be best adapted for South Texas?

== Criticism ==
The idea of convergent thinking has been critiqued by researchers who claim that not all problems have solutions that can be effectively ranked. Convergent thinking assigns a position to one solution over another. The problem is that when one is dealing with more complex problems, the individual may not be able to appropriately rank the solutions available to them. In these instances, researchers indicate that when dealing with complex problems, other variables such as one's gut feeling or instinctive problem solving abilities also have a role in determining a solution to a given problem.

Furthermore, convergent thinking has also been said to devalue minority arguments. In a study where experimental manipulations were used to motivate subjects to engage in convergent or divergent thinking when presented with either majority or minority support for persuasive arguments, a pattern emerged under the convergent thinking condition where majority support produced more positive attitudes on the focal issue. Conversely, minority support for the argument had no effect on the subjects. The convergent thinkers are too focused with selecting the best answer that they fail to appropriately evaluate minority opinion and could end up dismissing accurate solutions.

== See also ==
- Divergent thinking
