= Situation puzzle =

Oral puzzle guessing game

Situation puzzles, often referred to as minute mysteries, lateral thinking puzzles or yes/no puzzles, are puzzles in which other participants are to construct a story that the host has in mind, basing on a puzzling situation that is given at the start.

These puzzles are inexact and many puzzle statements have more than one possible fitting answer. The goal however is to find out the story as the host has it in mind, not just any plausible answer. Critical thinking, reading, logical thinking, as well as lateral thinking may all be required to solve a situation puzzle.

The term lateral thinking was coined by Edward de Bono in the 1960s and 1970s, to denote a creative problem-solving style that involves looking at the given situation from unexpected angles, and is typically necessary to the solution of situation puzzles. The format resembles traditional riddles but gained popularity in the 20th century through puzzle books and magazines. Paul Sloane's Lateral Thinking Puzzlers series and Raymond Smullyan's collections helped popularize the format in print. In the 1990s, archives such as the rec.puzzles Usenet group widely disseminated situation puzzles online.

Conceptual reviews in English language teaching recommend lateral thinking strategies as a pathway for fostering higher-order thinking skills (HOTS). Analyses of teaching practice note that lateral thinking enables cognitive restructuring and idea generation, fundamental to solving situation puzzles. Critics note that some puzzles rely on arbitrary details or cultural knowledge, leading to a 'guess what the author is thinking' dynamic that can frustrate solvers.

== Gameplay ==
A typical game is played with at least two roles:

- The host presents the initial puzzling scenario, knows the canonical solution and answers questions accordingly.
- The solver(s) ask yes–no questions to gradually uncover the explanation.

Typically, questions may only be answered with "yes," "no," and "irrelevant". Depending upon the settings and level of difficulty, other answers, hints or simple explanations of why the answer is yes or no, may be considered acceptable. For higher levels of difficulty, solvers may only ask a limited number of questions. The puzzle is solved when one of the solvers is able to recite the narrative the host had in mind, in particular explaining whatever aspect of the initial scenario was puzzling.

== Characteristics ==
Situation puzzles usually share several traits:

- Hidden assumptions: Words or phrases appear ordinary but invite incorrect interpretations (e.g., "car" refers to a board game piece).
- Narrative reconstruction: The solution is a backstory that makes the initial puzzle reasonable.
- Multiple possible answers: Many puzzles allow several plausible explanations, but the expected solution is the one the host holds in mind.
- Collaborative deduction: Success depends on collective questioning and testing of hypotheses.

== Examples ==
One celebrated situation puzzle is:

A man walks into a bar, and asks the bartender for a drink of water. The bartender pulls out a gun and points it at the man. The man pauses, before saying "Thank you" and leaving. What happened?

The question-and-answer segment might go something like this.

1. Question: Could the bartender hear him? Answer: Yes
2. Question: Was the bartender angry for some reason? A: No
3. Question: Was the gun a water pistol? A: No
4. Question: Did they know each other from before? A: Irrelevant (or: "no" since either way it does not affect the story)
5. Question: Was the man's "thank you" sarcastic? A: No (or with a small hint: "No, he was genuinely grateful")
6. Question: Did the man ask for water in an offensive way? A: No
7. Question: Did the man ask for water in some strange way? A: Yes

Eventually the questions lead up to the conclusion that the man had the hiccups, and that his reason for requesting a drink of water was not to quench his thirst but to cure his hiccups. The bartender realized this and chose instead to cure the hiccups by frightening the man with the gun. Once the man realized that his hiccups were gone, he no longer needed a drink of water, gratefully thanked the bartender, and left.

There are more circulated examples. These examples illustrate the variety of misleading assumptions used, including:

- The Iced Coffees: Two men enter a bar. They both order identical iced coffees. One lives; the other dies. How come? (Solution:The drinks contain poisoned ice cubes; one man drinks slowly, giving them time to melt, while the other drinks quickly and thus doesn't get much of the poison.)
- The hotel and the car: A man pushes his car to a hotel and loses his fortune. How come? (Solution: the "car" and "hotel" are from the game Monopoly.)
- The elevator man: A resident of a tall building can only ride the elevator partway up, except on rainy days. How come? (Solution: as a man of short stature, he cannot reach the top buttons without his umbrella.)

== Terminology ==
- Yope is a word devised to answer a question with yes and no simultaneously, in a sense saying Yes, but … and No, but … at the same time. This would be used when it would be misleading to give a simple "yes" or "no" answer to the solver's question. For example, the question asked may be a compound question which contains two clauses connected with "and", one clause is true, the other is false; if the host answers "no", the solvers may assume both clauses being false, and be misled.
- Irrelevant (or n/a) is used when a question is not applicable to the current situation or when a "yes" or "no" answer would not provide any usable information to solving the puzzle.
- Irrelevant, but assume yes (or assume no) is used when the situation is the same regardless of what the correct answer to the question is, but assuming one direction will make further questioning easier or the situation more likely. An example question that might have this answer from the puzzle above is: "Was the gun loaded?"

== See also ==
- Twenty Questions
- Divide and conquer algorithm
- Brain teaser
- Riddle
- Creative problem solving
