= Lateral thinking =

Manner of solving problems

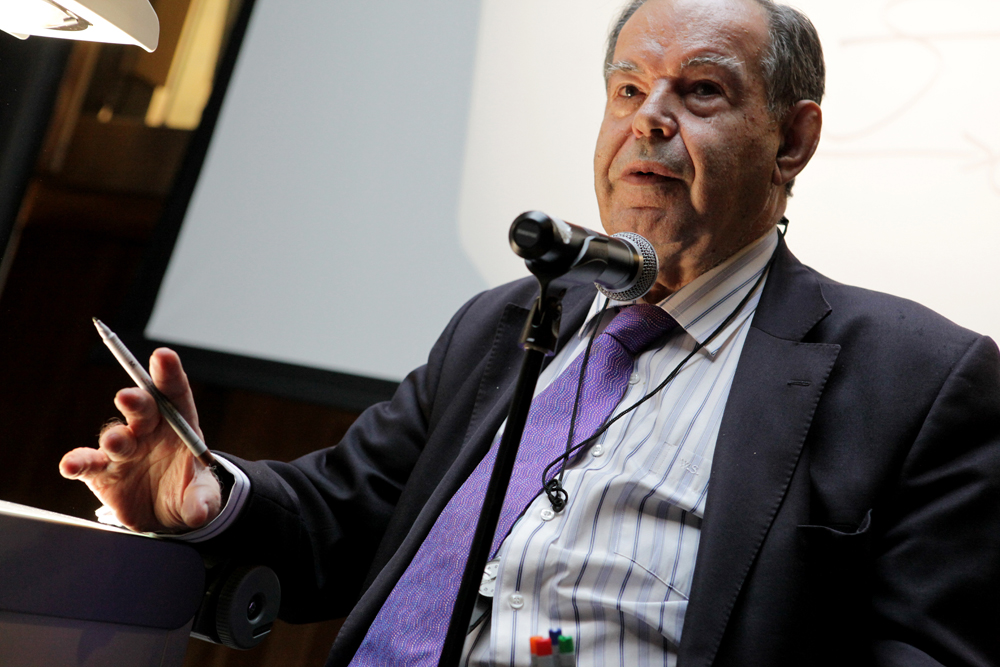
Maltese psychologist Edward de Bono (pictured in 2009) introduced the term "lateral thinking" in 1967.

Lateral thinking is a manner of solving problems using an indirect and creative approach via reasoning that is not immediately obvious. Synonymous to thinking outside the box, it involves ideas that may not be obtainable using only traditional step-by-step logic. The cutting of the Gordian Knot is a classical example.

The term was first used in 1967 by Maltese psychologist Edward de Bono who used the Judgement of Solomon, the Nine Dots Puzzle, and the sewing machine (automating the work rather than adding more workers) as examples, among many others, of lateral thinking.

Lateral thinking deliberately distances itself from vertical thinking, the traditional method for problem solving.

Vertical versus Lateral Thinking
	Vertical Thinking	Lateral Thinking
linear	yes	no
pattern	develop an existing pattern	restructure an existing pattern
direction	stepwise and methodical	multidirectional and creative
uncertainty tolerated	no	yes
rewards for	depth of knowledge	breadth of knowledge
restricted by relevant information	yes	no
novel approaches welcomed	no	yes

De Bono argues lateral thinking entails a switch-over from a familiar pattern to a new, unexpected one. Such insight sometimes takes the form of humour but can also be cultivated.

Critics have characterized lateral thinking as a pseudo-scientific concept, arguing de Bono's core ideas have never been rigorously tested or corroborated.

== Methods ==
Lateral thinking has to be distinguished from critical thinking. Critical thinking is primarily concerned with judging the true value of statements and seeking errors whereas lateral thinking focuses more on the "movement value" of statements and ideas. A person uses lateral thinking to move from one known idea to new ideas. Edward de Bono defines four types of thinking tools:

1. idea-generating tools intended to break current thinking patterns—routine patterns, the status quo
2. focus tools intended to broaden where to search for new ideas
3. harvest tools intended to ensure more value is received from idea generating output
4. treatment tools that promote consideration of real-world constraints, resources, and support

=== Random entry idea generation ===
The thinker chooses an object at random, or a noun from a dictionary and associates it with the area they are thinking about. De Bono exemplifies this through the randomly chosen word "nose" being applied to an office photocopier, leading to the idea that the copier could produce a lavender smell when it was low on paper.

=== Provocation idea generation ===
A provocation is a statement that we know is wrong or impossible but used to create new ideas. De Bono gives an example of considering river pollution and setting up the provocation, "the factory is downstream of itself", causing a factory to be forced to take its water input from a point downstream of its output, an idea which later became law in some countries. Provocations can be set up by the use of any of the provocation techniques—wishful thinking, exaggeration, reversal, escape, distortion, or arising. The thinker creates a list of provocations and then uses the most outlandish ones to move their thinking forward to new ideas.

=== Movement techniques ===
The purpose of movement techniques is to produce as many alternatives as possible in order to encourage new ways of thinking about both problems and solutions. The production of alternatives tends to produce many possible solutions to problems that seemed to only have one possible solution. One can move from a provocation to a new idea through the following methods: extract a principle, focus on the difference, moment to moment, positive aspects or special circumstances.

=== Challenge ===
A tool which is designed to ask the question, "Why?", in a non-threatening way: why something exists or why it is done the way it is. The result is a very clear understanding of "Why?", which naturally leads to new ideas. The goal is to be able to challenge anything at all, not just those things that are problematic. For example, one could challenge the handles on coffee cups: The reason for the handle seems to be that the cup is often too hot to hold directly; perhaps coffee cups could be made with insulated finger grips, or there could be separate coffee-cup holders similar to beer holders, or coffee should not be so hot in the first place.

=== Concept formation ===
Ideas carry out concepts. This tool systematically expands the range and number of concepts in order to end up with a very broad range of ideas to consider.

=== Disproving ===
Based on the idea that the majority is always wrong (as suggested by Henrik Ibsen and by John Kenneth Galbraith), take anything that is obvious and generally accepted as "goes without saying", question it, take an opposite view, and try to convincingly disprove it. This technique is similar to de Bono's "Black Hat" of Six Thinking Hats, which looks at identifying reasons to be cautious and conservative.

=== Fractionation ===
The purpose of fractionation is to create alternative perceptions of problems and solutions by taking the commonplace view of the situation and breaking it into multiple alternative situations in order to break away from the fixed view and see the situation from different angles. This allows the generation of multiple possible solutions that can be synthesized into more comprehensive answers.

== Problem solving ==
Problem solving
When something creates a problem, the performance or the status quo of the situation drops. Problem-solving deals with finding out what caused the problem and then figuring out ways to fix the problem. The objective is to get the situation to where it should be. For example, a production line has an established run rate of 1000 items per hour. Suddenly, the run rate drops to 800 items per hour. Ideas as to why this happened and solutions to repair the production line must be thought of, such as giving the worker a pay raise. A study on engineering students' abilities to answer very open-ended questions suggests that students showing more lateral thinking were able to solve the problems much quicker and more accurately.

Lateral problem "solving"
Lateral thinking often produces solutions that appear "obvious" in hindsight. It can often highlight problems people never knew they had, or solve simple problems that have huge impacts. For example, if a production line produced 1000 books per hour, lateral thinking may suggest that a drop in output to 800 would lead to higher quality, and more motivated workers. Students have shown lateral thinking in their application of a variety of individual, unique concepts in order to solve complex problems.

== See also ==
- Nine dots puzzle – Mathematical puzzle
- Derailment (thought disorder) – Thought disorder in psychiatry
- Serendipity – Unplanned, fortunate discovery
- Thought – Cognitive process independent of the senses (outline)
  - Convergent thinking – Ability to answer questions correctly without the need for novel ideas
  - Creativity techniques – Methods devised to encourage creative actions
    - Brainstorming – Group creativity technique
    - Divergent thinking – Process of generating creative ideas
  - Critical thinking – Analysis of facts to form a judgment
  - Data thinking – Product design framework
  - Higher-order thinking – Concept in education and education reform
  - Problem solving – Process of achieving a goal by overcoming obstacles
    - Lateral thinking related
      - Oblique Strategies – Set of cards intended to promote creativity
      - Parallel thinking – Maltese physician (1933–2021)
      - Provocative operation – Signals provocation
      - Six Thinking Hats – 1985 book by Maltese Dr. Edward de Bono
    - Thinking outside the box – Metaphor for unconventional thinking
    - Vertical thinking – Thinking technique that involves an analytical approach to problem solving
  - Reason – Capacity for consciously making sense of things
    - Logical reasoning – Process of drawing correct inferences
      - Abductive reasoning – Inference seeking the simplest and most likely explanation
      - Deductive reasoning – Form of reasoning
      - Inductive reasoning – Method of logical reasoning
  - Strategic thinking – Cognitive activity
