= Mere Anarchy =

2007 anthology of essays by Woody Allen

- Hardcover edition
- Author: Woody Allen
- Language: English
- Genre: Fiction
- Publisher: Ebury Press
- Publication date: 5 July 2007
- Publication place: United Kingdom
- Media type: Print
- Pages: 176 pp.
- ISBN: 978-0091920210 hardcover edition
- OCLC: 85897685

Mere Anarchy is an anthology of essays by Woody Allen. First published on July 5, 2007, by Ebury Press, the book is a collection of 18 tales, 10 of which previously ran in The New Yorker. It was Allen's first collection in 25 years.

== Reception ==
In The New York Times, Janet Maslin wrote that Allen's "writing style [...] remains impervious to the changing world around him", that the older essays "outshine" the newer ones but that the newer ones "hold their own", and that the collection is "nostalgically enjoyable" and "timelessly bright". In the Guardian, Adam Mars-Jones called the essays "perfunctory" and "lazy riffs and lame parodies [that] do more to annoy than entertain", while faulting Allen's use of a "facetious linguistic register" and "comedy names". Publishers Weekly wrote, "While this collection doesn't quite measure up to Allen's Without Feathers (1975), there are pieces here—for instance, the report on Mickey Mouse's testimony at the Michael Eisner/Michael Ovitz trial—that will put a rictus on your kisser." Tasha Robinson of The A.V. Club wrote, "At its best, Mere Anarchy is absurd fun, but even Allen's best at this point is only meant for those familiar with, and predisposed to love, his intensely quirky style."

== Contents ==
1. To Err Is Human; To Float, Divine
2. Tandoori Ransom
3. Sam, You Made the Pants Too Fragrant
4. This Nib for Hire
5. Calisthenics, Poison Ivy, Final Cut
6. Nanny Dearest
7. How Deadly Your Taste Buds, My Sweet
8. Glory Hallelujah, Sold!
9. Caution, Falling Moguls
10. The Rejection
11. Sing, You Sacher Tortes
12. On a Bad Day You Can See Forever
13. Attention Geniuses: Cash Only
14. Strung Out
15. Above The Law, Below the Box Springs
16. Thus Ate Zarathustra
17. Surprise Rocks Disney Trial
18. Pinchuck's Law
