= Star Trek: A Time to... =

Novel series by multiple authors

Star Trek: A Time to…
- A Time to Be Born; A Time to Die; A Time to Sow; A Time to Harvest; A Time to Love; A Time to Hate; A Time to Kill; A Time to Heal; A Time for War, a Time for Peace
- Country: United States
- Language: English
- Genre: Science fiction
- Publisher: Pocket Books
- Published: 2004
- No. of books: 9
- Website: startrekbooks.com

Star Trek: A Time to... is a series of nine novels set in the fictional universe of Star Trek: The Next Generation. It deals with the ship and crew of the Enterprise (NCC-1701-E) between the events of the films Star Trek: Insurrection (1998) and Star Trek Nemesis (2002). The series includes explanations for some apparent continuity problems between these films.

For the first eight books, successive pairs of books each provide one story arc; the ninth book is a stand-alone story. The series continues, with each book directly following the last event when a story arc has finished. All nine novels in the series were published in 2004.

== Production ==
=== A Time to Be Born ===
A Time to Be Born by John Vornholt is the first novel in the series. It deals with the aftermath of a vicious battle in the Rashanar sector during the Dominion War that left the area littered with the remains of many ships. The region is full of electro-magnetic disturbances that have repeatedly damaged salvage ships. Androssi pirates have been raiding the graveyard for technology.

The Enterprise is assigned to patrol the battle site and recover the bodies of deceased Federation personnel. Soon after arriving strange events occur within the battle site and the Enterprise must investigate, while at the same time keeping the peace with the locals from a nearby planet. Amidst the dangers of the sector, a mysterious ghost ship has begun destroying salvage ships and pirates alike. As the Enterprise investigates, concerns rise that this could be a Founder weapon as the crew seeks to uncover the true nature of the ship.

Starfleet has doubts about the validity of the crews' conclusions as political tensions between Picard and the Admiralty grow. The Traveler and Wesley Crusher, now also a Traveler, observe the events of the book.

=== A Time to Die ===
In Vornholt's sequel A Time to Die, Captain Jean-Luc Picard is being held under psychiatric evaluation, while his crew attempts to carry on as usual. However, with some intervention from The Traveler, Picard and the crew are given the opportunity to prove their innocence for their apparently outrageous behavior while stationed in the Rashanar Battle site.

=== A Time to Sow and A Time to Harvest ===
A Time to Sow and A Time to Harvest were written by Dayton Ward and Kevin Dilmore. After clearing their names for attacks against the Onatailians, Picard and crew are still ostracised, and are sent on a mission to an unexplored sector as punishment. They are to find the remains of a civilization that should have died two centuries earlier. However, upon arrival, the Dokaalans are still alive.

This peaceful civilization is under extreme strain, recently experiencing numerous "accidents", and it is up to the Enterprise to help them.

=== A Time to Love and A Time to Hate ===
A Time to Love and A Time to Hate were written by Robert Greenberger. After saving the Dokaalans from being exploited by another race, the Enterprise is sent on another mission that no one else wants. Delta Sigma IV was seen as the perfect example of interspecies cooperation as two rival species, the Dorset and Bader, found peace and settled their own colony. On the verge of intra-planetary celebrations a murder takes place, the first on the planet for over one hundred years.

The murder occurred between two test subjects who were undergoing a treatment that should have cured Delta Sigma IV's population of an early aging disease. The cure came from the Federation; after the Federation representative Kyle Riker disappears, tension mounts between the crew of the Enterprise and the colonists. Acts of violence erupt across the planet and only the crew of the Enterprise can stop the planet's society from spiralling into destruction.

=== A Time to Kill and A Time to Heal ===
A Time to Kill and A Time to Heal were written by David Alan Mack. In the first novel, an insane dictator comes to power on the planet Tezwa, near the Klingon-Federation border. When the Klingons attempt to respond, the dictator destroys their fleet with planet-based weapons that were secretly provided to Tezwa by the Federation President, as a last resort during the Dominion War. In order to prevent this secret from getting out, the President orders the Enterprise crew to conquer the planet and destroy the weapons.

In A Time to Heal, the Enterprise crew remains entrenched on Tezwa, caught up in an illegal occupation under constant attack by insurgents led by the deposed dictator. Investigations lead to the discovery of the Federation President's involvement in providing the weapons to Tezwa.

=== A Time for War, a Time for Peace ===
A Time for War, A Time for Peace by Keith R. A. DeCandido is the last in the series. The book deals with the events directly preceding and the beginning of the film Star Trek Nemesis. The story revolves predominantly around several problems occurring on the Klingon homeworld, including an embassy siege, the Emperor going missing and Ambassador Worf's attempts to preserve the Klingon-Federation alliance. There is also coverage of the new Federation president and a surprise inspection of the Enterprise.

=== Continuity with the Star Trek canon ===
This book goes a long way to explaining certain discrepancies as seen in the tenth Star Trek film Nemesis. Although the books are not considered canon, they do give plausible reasons.

In the film during Captain Riker's and Commander Troi's wedding the character of Wesley Crusher is seen, even though in the TNG episode "Journey's End" he was seen leaving with the Traveler. This is explained in the book as he came back in the first two books of the A Time to... series to help the crew of the Enterprise and now he's back to finally see the wedding. Also in the film he's seen wearing a lieutenant's dress uniform even though he never finished Starfleet Academy; this is explained, as Crusher, expecting a traditional nude Betazoid wedding, came back with no clothes, and the Quartermaster had no other dress uniforms available in his size.

In the film Worf is seen as Chief of Security/Chief Tactical Officer, even though he left Deep Space Nine as the Federation Ambassador to the Klingon Empire. The book explains how Worf had grown tired of politics and wished to see more action, leaving his son Alexander to be the next ambassador. Worf also replaces the character of Christine Vale, the previous Chief of Security who is a main character in the previous "A Time to" books. At the end of the book before the Enterprise departs for the event in Nemesis, Christine Vale decides to take some extended shore leave.

== Novels ==
Intended to be a sequence of twelve novels.

| No. | Title | Author(s) | Date | ISBN |
|---|---|---|---|---|
| 1 | A Time to Be Born | John Vornholt | January 27, 2004 | 0-7434-6765-5 |
| 2 | A Time to Die | John Vornholt | February 24, 2004 | 0-7434-6766-3 |
| 3 | A Time to Sow | Dayton Ward and Kevin Dilmore | March 30, 2004 | 0-7434-8299-9 |
| 4 | A Time to Harvest | Dayton Ward and Kevin Dilmore | April 27, 2004 | 0-7434-8298-0 |
| 5 | A Time to Love | Robert Greenberger | May 25, 2004 | 0-7434-6285-8 |
| 6 | A Time to Hate | Robert Greenberger | June 29, 2004 | 0-7434-6289-0 |
| 7 | A Time to Kill | David Mack | July 27, 2004 | 0-7434-9177-7 |
| 8 | A Time to Heal | David Mack | August 31, 2004 | 0-7434-9178-5 |
| 9 | A Time for War, a Time for Peace | Keith DeCandido | September 28, 2004 | 0-7434-9179-3 |

== See also ==
- List of Star Trek novels
- List of Star Trek: Deep Space Nine novels
- List of Star Trek: The Next Generation novels
