= Star Trek: New Frontier =

Star Trek spinoff novel series

- Cover of 1998 omnibus
- Author: Peter David
- Country: United States
- Language: English
- Genre: Science fiction
- Publisher: Simon & Schuster; IDW Publishing
- Published: 1997–2015
- Media type: Print (Paperback); Digital (eBook)
- No. of books: 25
- Website: startrekbooks.com

Star Trek: New Frontier is a series of interlinked novels written by Peter David, published by Simon & Schuster imprints, Pocket Books, Pocket Star, and Gallery Books, from 1997 to 2015. New Frontier was the first Star Trek tie-in fiction property not to be based on a television series. The series was created by John J. Ordover.

The novels explore life aboard the USS Excalibur, commanded by Capt. Mackenzie Calhoun. New Frontier is concurrent with The Next Generation, Deep Space Nine, and Voyager television series and their tie-in book lines.

== Production ==
John J. Ordover said in Voyages of Imagination (2009), "One of the major problems with the novels at the time [the mid-nineties] … was you couldn't put any inherent continuity into them and you couldn’t make any significant changes, so characters couldn’t die, they couldn't change, they couldn't leave. The core characters always had to remain the same. After a few years, that gets frustrating for an editor." Ordover devised New Frontier to accomplish what he couldn't with the other Star Trek book lines—to create a serialized, internally consistent, series of novels set in the Star Trek universe. According to Peter David, "Paramount's belief was that there would be little to no interest from the fans in a [Star Trek] series that did not stem directly from the [television] shows." He was given "their blessing", with the caveat a number of characters from The Next Generation were to be included.

“Peter David made up MacKenzie Calhoun on his own," said Ordover. Likewise, David said, "I’m pretty sure John came up with the Excalibur. He told me the characters he wanted to use and I was allowed to run with it." David then "fleshed out the concept and created the original characters."

Four novels were published in paperback novella format in 1997, similar to the release of The Green Mile by Stephen King. An omnibus was published in 1998. The novels that followed were published in mass-market paperback format. No Limits (2003), an anthology of short stories edited by David, was published in trade paperback format.

WildStorm published a graphic novel in 2000, written by David, with artists Mike Collins and David Roach. A five-issue comic book miniseries was published by IDW Publishing in 2008, also by David, with artist Stephen Thompson.

In total, twenty four novels, a short story anthology, and two graphic novels, have been published as of 2015, in addition to several short stories, and related works, by other writers. Characters and settings from New Frontier have appeared appear in other Star Trek novels, most of which were written by David. Novels have been included in crossovers with other Star Trek book lines, such as: The Captain's Table (1998), Double Helix (1999) Gateways (2000), The Lost Era (2003), and the Mirror Universe (2007–2009) anthologies. A short story by David was anthologized in the Tales of the Dominion War (2004), edited by Keith DeCandido.

The Returned (2015), the most recent installment of the series, was published as a three-part ebook exclusive by Pocket Star.

== Premise ==
The once-powerful Thallonian Empire has collapsed following a popular uprising, destabilizing a vast region of space known as Sector 221-G. Starfleet has dispatched the USS Excalibur (NCC-26517), under the command of Captain Mackenzie Calhoun, to fly the flag, and offer aid to those affected by the political and economic instability of the region.

=== Characters ===
The characters in New Frontier are an amalgam of characters from the Animated Series, The Next Generation, David's trilogy of young adult Starfleet Academy novels, and new characters created for the series. The series is written in an ensemble-cast style, similar to a television series. However, the primary characters are Calhoun, Commander Elizabeth Shelby, and Vulcan medical officer Dr. Selar.

==== Mackenzie Calhoun ====
Captain Mackenzie Calhoun (born M'k'n'zy of Calhoun) is a member of the Xenexian species, a race that, for years, was under the rule of the Danteri. (Xenexians closely resemble humans, with purple eyes being the major distinguishing feature.) Calhoun led the Xenexian revolution that freed them from the Danteri, a revolution that ended before Calhoun turned 20. After a visit from Stargazer captain Jean-Luc Picard, whom he had seen in a hallucinatory vision prior to the meeting, Calhoun left his homeworld and joined Starfleet. After a falling-out after the events surrounding the death of his captain on the USS Grissom, Calhoun left Starfleet, but was lured back by Picard and took command of the Excalibur. His cowboy-like command style sometimes irks his co-workers (particularly Shelby and Jellico), but he has always been able to get the job done.

Peter David has stated that the character of Commander Quentin Stone from his 1991 TNG novel, A Rock and a Hard Place, unintentionally turned out to be an early draft of Calhoun.

==== Elizabeth Shelby ====
Lt. Commander Elizabeth Shelby first appeared in the TNG episodes "The Best of Both Worlds Parts 1 and 2", where she was played by Elizabeth Dennehy. Shelby was assigned to the USS Excalibur some years before New Frontier under the command of Captain Korsmo. She was romantically involved with Calhoun during her time at Starfleet Academy. When the series began, Shelby served as first officer of the Excalibur under Calhoun; their relationship was decidedly platonic, but she has since married Calhoun, been promoted to her own command as captain of the USS Trident and later, Admiral in command of Starfleet's Bravo Station, where she administratively oversees activities in Sector 221-G, the focal point of many New Frontier adventures. She makes a brief appearance as a major Starfleet Admiral in Star Trek: Picard Season 3's penultimate episode.

==== Burgoyne 172 ====
Burgoyne 172, a member of the Hermat species, is neither exactly male nor exactly female, but is instead a combination of the two (as such, the character is generally referred to in the NF books and comic books by the merged personal pronouns "s/he" and "hir"). Originally, s/he served the chief engineer of the Excalibur under Captains Korsmo and Calhoun, but has since received a promotion, and now holds the position of first officer on the current ship bearing that name. Burgoyne has become romantically involved with Dr. Selar, and together they have one child. In the novel "Treason," when Selar is manipulated into kidnapping Robin Lefler's child, Burgoyne is injured trying to stop her. Seeking to make amends, Selar decides to remove Burgoyne's "hurt" by using a mind meld to erase all hir memories of their relationship. Thus, when Mac complains about Burgoyne risking hirself to save the woman s/he loves, Burgoyne is confused and Soleta confirms what Selar did, leaving Mac unsure whether to tell Burgoyne the truth or have hir hurt losing hir love.

==== Selar ====
Doctor T'Para Lotos Selar, a female Vulcan, originally appeared in the TNG episode "The Schizoid Man" as a lieutenant and medical officer under Dr. Pulaski. Dr. Selar was played by Suzie Plakson. She is the Chief Medical Officer on board the Excalibur. It is revealed in the opening New Frontier novel story arc that her husband, Voltak, suffered a fatal heart attack years earlier when they were consummating their marriage during pon farr. As a result, she never completed the act, and was in a suppressed state of incomplete pon farr until she met the Excalibur's chief engineer, Burgoyne 172. The two began a relationship, and Selar bore them a son, Xyon. In the 2009 novel Treason, Selar, desperate for a cure for the rapid aging that afflicted Xyon, was telepathically manipulated by a race called the D'myurj into kidnapping Cwansi, the infant son of Robin Lefler and Si Cwan. In atoning for her act by rescuing Cwansi, Selar sacrificed herself by destroying the D'myurj's base of operations in an explosion that took her life. Previous to that, she decided to ease the hurt she had done to Burgoyne by using a mind meld to erase the pain from his memories of their relationship.

==== Other characters ====
Robin Lefler served for a time on the USS Enterprise-D (where she appeared in the TNG episodes "Darmok" and "The Game", played by Ashley Judd). Lefler was later assigned as chief operations officer for the Excalibur. During this time, she finally rediscovered her missing mother, Morgan. Lefler later married Si Cwan and settled with him on a planet in the Thallonian Empire, where she served as an Ambassador. After Si Cwan's death she gave birth to his child and briefly ruled the Thallonian world before leaving with the child for their own safety.

Soleta was the third of the characters that originated in the Starfleet Academy novels. She is half-Vulcan and half-Romulan. Soleta served as the science officer of the Excalibur for many years until her true heritage was revealed. She then allied herself with the Romulan Empire and served as captain of the stealth ship Spectre. However, after the Romulan emperor was assassinated during a coup (depicted in the film Star Trek Nemesis), Soleta undertook freelance espionage engagements in support of the Thallonians or Mackenzie Calhoun.

Zak Kebron is a Brikar. He first appeared in the young adult Starfleet Academy novels, where he was shown as attending the Academy with Worf (his roommate), Mark McHenry, and Soleta. Kebron's species has a thick hide, are incredibly massive, and have a very long lifespan. They do not undergo their version of puberty for many years (by human standards); Kebron underwent this phase while serving on the Excalibur. Originally the security officer, the metamorphosed Kebron (whose personality has become far more open, caring and verbose since his transformation) now serves double-duty as counselor on the current Excalibur.

Arex originally served on the USS Enterprise under Captain James T. Kirk (as portrayed in the animated Star Trek, where he was voiced by James Doohan) as a navigation officer. The three-armed, three-legged officer was stuck in time until he was later recovered by Starfleet, and became chief of security on the USS Trident.

M'Ress (also portrayed in the animated Star Trek, where she was voiced by Majel Barrett) served with Arex on the USS Enterprise as a communications officer. M'Ress is a Caitian and has many cat-like features, including pointed ears, a mane, and a tail. Like Arex, she was thrown forward in time nearly a century. M'Ress had some difficulty adapting to her new time period, which was not helped when she was mind-raped by another member of the crew, but eventually became chief science officer on the Trident.

=== Ships ===
New Frontier follows the crews of several Starfleet ships:

- USS Excalibur (NCC-26517): The Excalibur is an Ambassador-class starship, originally captained by Morgan Korsmo. Command is passed to Mackenzie Calhoun at the start of the series. The Excalibur is destroyed in Dark Allies (1999).
- USS Exeter (NCC-26531): Commander Elizabeth Shelby is promoted to captain of the Exeter in Restoration (2000). The ship's command is later passed to Alexandra Garbeck when Shelby is promoted to command of the Excalibur-A.
- USS Excalibur (NCC-26517-A): A Galaxy-class explorer launched to replace the previous Ambassador-class starship of the same name.
- USS Trident (NCC-31347): Shelby's second command; a Galaxy-class starship assigned to accompany the Excalibur-A. Command of the Trident passed to Katerina Mueller following Shelby's promotion to fleet command.

== Reception ==
Katherine Trendacosta of io9 said New Frontier filled in "a gap in the [Star Trek] universe that you didn’t even realize was there. And it did it all while being fun and smartly written." She said the character Calhoun is "so perfect he feels like a stealth parody of a Mary Sue." Dan Gunther, in his review of Cold Wars (2001), said "David has a solid handle on his characters."

Alison Baumgartner of ScienceFiction.com described New Frontier as having "all the space adventuring" of The Next Generation and Original Series, "mixed with all the political intrigue of Deep Space Nine, making it the best of all possible Star Trek worlds."

== Novels ==
Key:
†	Hardcover first edition.
◊	Published as an ebook exclusive.
‡	Included in omnibus or collection.
Teal	Book line or flagship series name.
Navy	Miniseries name.
Pink	Crossover series name.
ed.	Omnibus or collection editor(s).
et al.	Multiple authors, see note.

All novels published as paperback editions, except where indicated.

=== Numbered novels ===
Novels are inconsistently numbered among primary sources.

No.	Title	Date	ISBN
1	House of Cards ‡	July 1997	0-671-01395-5
2	Into the Void ‡	July 1997	0-671-01396-3
3	The Two-Front War ‡	August 1997	0-671-01397-1
4	End Game (Note: Similarly named novels: End Game (1997), a New Frontier novel by Peter David; Endgame (2001), a Voyager episode novelization by Diane Carey.) ‡	August 1997	0-671-01398-X
5	Martyr	March 1998	0-671-02036-6
6	Fire on High	April 1998	0-671-02037-4
7	The Quiet Place	November 1999	0-671-02079-X
8	Dark Allies	November 1999	0-671-02080-3
9	Requiem (Excalibur, Book 1)	September 2000	0-671-04238-6
10	Renaissance (Excalibur, Book 2)	September 2000	0-671-04239-4
11	Restoration † (Excalibur, Book 3)	November 2000	0-671-04243-2
12	Being Human	October 30, 2001	0-671-04240-8

=== Original novels ===
Original and crossover novels written by Peter David.

Title	Date	ISBN
Once Burned (Note: Once Burned (1998) as by Mackenzie Calhoun, in his own words, as recorded by Peter David.) ‡ (The Captain's Table, Book 5)	October 1998	0-671-02078-1
Cold Wars (Gateways, Book 6)	October 2, 2001	0-671-04242-4
Gods Above	September 30, 2003	0-7434-1858-1
Stone and Anvil †	October 28, 2003	0-7434-2957-5
After the Fall †	November 30, 2004	0-7434-9184-X
Missing in Action †	February 28, 2006	1-4165-1080-X
Treason	April 14, 2009	978-0-7434-2961-0
Blind Man’s Bluff	April 26, 2011	978-0-7434-2960-3
The Returned, Part One ◊	July 6, 2015	978-1-4767-9092-3
The Returned, Part Two ◊	August 3, 2015	978-1-4767-9093-0
The Returned, Part Three ◊	September 7, 2015	978-1-4767-9095-4

=== Omnibus editions ===
Published by Simon & Schuster.

Title	Date	ISBN
New Frontier (Note: Omnibus edition includes New Frontier, Books 1 – 4.)	February 1998	0-671-01978-3
The Captain's Table (Note: The Captain's Table (2000) edited by Dean Wesley Smith and John J. Ordover, with L.A. Graf, Michael Jan Friedman, Dean Wesley Smith and Kristine Kathryn Rusch, Diane Carey, Peter David, Jerry Oltion.)	March 2000	0-671-04052-9

== Short fiction ==
Collections that include New Frontier short fiction. All written by Peter, except those collected in No Limits (2003).

Title	Collection	Editor(s)	Date	ISBN
"Death After Life"	What Lay Beyond (Gateways, Book 7)	John J. Ordover (Note: What Lay Beyond (2001) by John J. Ordover, editor, with Diane Carey, Peter David, Keith DeCandido, Christie Golden, Robert Greenberger, and Susan Wright.)	October 30, 2001	0-7434-3112-X
"Stone Cold Truths"	Tales of the Dominion War	Keith DeCandido	August 3, 2004	0-7434-9171-8
"Pain Management"	Tales from the Captain's Table	Keith DeCandido	June 14, 2005	1-4165-0520-2

=== No Limits (2003) ===
Star Trek: New Frontier – No Limits (2003) collected stories written by popular Star Trek tie-in fiction writers and friends of Peter David. Each story is presented from the perspective of members of the Excalibur crew. "Making a Difference", by Mary Scott-Wiecek, is a retelling of the Battle of Wolf 359.

Collection	Editor(s)	Date	ISBN
No Limits	Peter David and Keith DeCandido	October 21, 2003	0-7434-7707-3

=== Mirror Universe (2007–2009) ===
Two collected works, written by David, set in the Mirror Universe.

Title	Collection	Author(s)	Date	ISBN
Cutting Ties (novella)	Obsidian Alliances	Keith DeCandido, Peter David, and Sara Shaw (Note: Sara Shaw is pseudonymous with David Mack.)	March 20, 2007	978-1-4165-2471-7
"Homecoming"	Shards and Shadows	Marco Palmieri and Margaret Clark, eds.	January 6, 2009	978-1-4165-5850-7

== Graphic novels ==
=== Double Time (2000) ===
Star Trek: New Frontier – Double Time (2000) is a single-issue, square bound, graphic novel published by WildStorm. Written by Peter David, with artists Michael Collins and David Roach. The title does not appear on the cover or spine, only the Star Trek: New Frontier word mark.

Issue	Date
Star Trek: New Frontier	September 27, 2000

=== Turnaround (2008) ===
Star Trek: New Frontier – Turnaround is a five-issue miniseries written by Peter David, with artist Stephen Thompson. Published by IDW Publishing.

No.	Date	Collection	Date	ISBN
1	March 26, 2008	Turnaround, Vol. 1	October 14, 2008	978-1-60010-266-0
2	April 23, 2008	Turnaround, Vol. 1	October 14, 2008	978-1-60010-266-0
3	June 4, 2008	Turnaround, Vol. 1	October 14, 2008	978-1-60010-266-0
4	July 2, 2008	Turnaround, Vol. 1	October 14, 2008	978-1-60010-266-0
5	July 23, 2008	Turnaround, Vol. 1	October 14, 2008	978-1-60010-266-0

== Related novels ==
Characters and settings from New Frontier appear in other Star Trek book lines:

Title	Author(s)	Date	ISBN
Doors into Chaos (Gateways, Book 3)	Robert Greenberger	August 28, 2001	0-7434-1856-5
Demons of Air and Darkness ‡ (Gateways, Book 4)	Keith DeCandido	August 28, 2001	0-7434-1852-2
Catalyst of Sorrows (The Lost Era, Book 6)	Margaret Wander Bonanno	December 30, 2003	0-7434-6407-9

=== The Next Generation (1991–2007) ===
Star Trek: The Next Generation novels which include characters from New Frontier :

Title	Author(s)	Date	ISBN
Vendetta	Peter David	May 1991	0-671-74145-4
Triangle: Imzadi II †	Peter David	November 1998	0-671-02532-5
Double or Nothing (Double Helix, Book 5)	Peter David	August 1999	0-671-03478-2
Diplomatic Implausibility	Keith DeCandido	January 30, 2001	0-671-78554-0
Q & A	Keith DeCandido	September 25, 2007	978-1-4165-2741-1
Before Dishonor	Peter David	October 30, 2007	978-1-4165-2742-8

=== Starfleet Academy (1993) ===
Star Trek: The Next Generation – Starfleet Academy young adult series explores the lives of the USS Enterprise crew as Starfleet Academy cadets. Three novellas written by Peter David tie into New Frontier

No.	Title ^	Date	ISBN
1	Worf's First Adventure	August 1993	0-671-87084-X
2	Line of Fire	October 1993	0-671-87085-8
3	Survival	December 1993	0-671-87086-6

=== Science Fiction Book Club ===
Omnibus editions published exclusively for the Science Fiction Book Club. New Frontier (1998) is very similar to the edition published by Pocket Books the following month. Prometheans (1998) is a book club exclusive.

Title †	Date	ISBN
New Frontier	January 1998	1-56865-502-9
Prometheans (Note: Omnibus edition includes New Frontier, Books 5 and 6.)	July 1998	1-56865-742-0

== See also ==
- List of Star Trek novels
- List of Star Trek: The Next Generation novels
