= List of Star Trek novels =

The Star Trek franchise's first tie-in publications were James Blish's 1967 volume of episode novelizations and Mack Reynolds's 1968 young adult novel Mission to Horatius. Since 1968, more than 850 original novels, short story collections, episode and film novelizations, and omnibus editions have been published.

Novels based on Star Trek, The Next Generation, Discovery, and Picard are currently in print. As recently as 2020, novels based on Deep Space Nine, Enterprise, and Voyager were published. Original concept and flagship series such as New Frontier, Titan, Seekers, and Vanguard have also been published since 1994.

Official publishers of Star Trek novels include Simon & Schuster and U.K. publisher Titan Books. Bantam Books published novels from 1967 to 1981. Past publishers include Western Publishing, Random House imprints Ballantine and Del Rey Books, Science Fiction Book Club. Publishers Heyne and Cross Cult publish German-language translations of Star Trek novels.

In 2001, Pocket Books estimated that there were 85 million copies in print. Michael Epstein, writing for Television Quarterly in 1996, said Star Trek was "by far the biggest series of fiction in the history of Western literature".

Key:
†	Hardcover first edition
^	Children's or young adult book
◊	Published as an ebook exclusive
‡	Reprinted in omnibus or collection
#	Published as a numbered novel
≈	Variant or retitled novel
Teal	Book line or flagship series name
Navy	Miniseries name
Pink	Crossover series name
ed.	Omnibus or collection editor(s)
et al.	Multiple authors, see note
Novels are organized according to book line or flagship series, miniseries, and crossover series, then sorted by release date.; All novels are published as paperback editions, except where indicated.; Many novels are listed more than once.

== Bantam Books (1967–1994) ==
Bantam Books was the first licensed publisher of Star Trek tie-in fiction. Bantam published all their novels as mass market paperbacks. Bantam also published Star Trek Lives! (1975) by Jacqueline Lichtenberg.

=== Episode novelizations (1967–1994) ===
Short story adaptations of The Original Series episodes written by James Blish and J. A. Lawrence. Mudd's Angels (1978) includes the novelizations of "Mudd's Women" and "I, Mudd", along with an original novella by Lawrence. The Day of the Dove (1985) is a variant of Star Trek 11 (1975). Mudd's Enterprise (1994) is a variant of Mudd's Angels.

Title	Author(s)	Date	Catalog / ISBN
Star Trek 1 (Note: Originally published as Star Trek in 1967. Retitled Star Trek 1 when reprinted from 1975 to 1981.)	James Blish	January 1967	F3459
Star Trek 2	James Blish	February 1968	F3439
Star Trek 3	James Blish	April 1969	F4371
Star Trek 4	James Blish	July 1971	S7009
Star Trek 5	James Blish	February 1972	S7300
Star Trek 6	James Blish	April 1972	S7364
Star Trek 7	James Blish	July 1972	S7480
Star Trek 8	James Blish	November 1972	SP7550
Star Trek 9	James Blish	August 1973	SP7808
Star Trek 10	James Blish	February 1974	SP8401
Star Trek 11 (Note: Star Trek 11 (1975), by James Blish, was reprinted as The Day of the Dove (1985).)	James Blish	April 1975	Q8717
Star Trek 12	James Blish and J. A. Lawrence	November 1977	0-553-11382-8
Mudd's Angels (Note: Mudd's Angels (1978), by J.A. Lawrence, was reprinted as Mudd's Enterprise (1994).) (Star Trek Adventures, Book 7)	J. A. Lawrence	May 1978	0-553-11802-1

=== Star Trek Adventures (1970–1981) ===
Novels based on The Original Series. (Note: Novels published by Bantam Books omitted The Original Series subtitle.) Bantam never applied an official series name to the novels, instead marketing each volume as a new or original "Star Trek Adventure". Library catalogs and booksellers numbered the series in publication order, including Mudd's Angels and The New Voyages. In 1993, the series was reprinted by Titan Books as Star Trek Adventures with different number stamps. The Star Trek Adventures name was retroactively applied to Bantam's releases by book discovery websites such as LibraryThing.

No.	Title	Author(s)	Date	Catalog / ISBN
1	Spock Must Die!	James Blish	February 1970	H5515
2	The New Voyages (short story collection)	Sondra Marshak and Myrna Culbreath, eds.	March 1976	X2719 (Note: ISBN 0-553-02719-0 based on catalog number X2719 was used by booksellers.)
3	Spock, Messiah!	Theodore Cogswell and Charles A. Spano Jr.	September 1976	0-553-10159-5
4	The Price of the Phoenix	Sondra Marshak and Myrna Culbreath	July 1977	0-553-10978-2
5	Planet of Judgment	Joe Haldeman	August 1977	0-553-11145-0
6	The New Voyages 2 (short story collection)	Sondra Marshak and Myrna Culbreath, eds.	January 1978	0-553-11392-5
7	Mudd's Angels (short story collection)	J. A. Lawrence	May 1978	0-553-11802-1
8	Vulcan! (Note: Similarly named works: Vulcan! (1978), a novel by Kathleen Sky; Vulcan (2017), a Hidden Universe fictional reference by Dayton Ward.)	Kathleen Sky	September 1978	0-553-12137-5
9	The Starless World	Gordon Eklund	November 1978	0-553-12371-8
10	Trek to Madworld	Stephen Goldin	January 1979	0-553-12618-0
11	World Without End	Joe Haldeman	February 1979	0-553-12583-4
12	The Fate of the Phoenix	Sondra Marshak and Myrna Culbreath	May 1979	0-553-12779-9
13	Devil World	Gordon Eklund	November 1979	0-553-13297-0
14	Perry's Planet	Jack C. Haldeman	February 1980	0-553-13580-5
15	The Galactic Whirlpool	David Gerrold	October 1980	0-553-14242-9
16	Death's Angel	Kathleen Sky	April 1981	0-553-14703-X

=== New Voyages (1976–1978) ===
Star Trek: The New Voyages collects fan-submitted fiction curated and edited by Sondra Marshak and Myrna Culbreath. Additional volumes were announced, but were not published. Pocket Books's Strange New Worlds (1998–2016) series, edited by Dean Wesley Smith collects fan-submitted stories.

Title	Editor(s)	Date	Catalog / ISBN
The New Voyages (Star Trek Adventures, Book 2)	Sondra Marshak and Myrna Culbreath	March 1976	X2719
The New Voyages 2 (Star Trek Adventures, Book 6)	Sondra Marshak and Myrna Culbreath	January 1978	0-553-11392-5

=== Classic Episodes (1991) ===
In 1991, Bantam collected The Original Series episode adaptations as a three volume omnibus edition organized by television season. The omnibus included new material by D. C. Fontana, Norman Spinrad, and others. The adaptations of "Mudd's Women" and "I, Mudd" were not included.

Title	Author(s)	Date	ISBN
The Classic Episodes 1	James Blish and J. A. Lawrence	August 1991	0-553-29138-6
The Classic Episodes 2	James Blish and J. A. Lawrence	August 1991	0-553-29139-4
The Classic Episodes 3	James Blish and J. A. Lawrence	August 1991	0-553-29140-8

== Random House (1974–1996) ==
Ballantine Books and Del Rey Books are imprints of Random House.

=== Star Trek Log (1974–1993) ===
Star Trek Log (Note: Majority of works published by Random House prior to 1996 omitted The Original Series and The Animated Series subtitles.) is a series adapted from episodes of The Animated Series, written by Alan Dean Foster. Published by Ballantine Books, and later Del Rey. Each volume includes original material by Foster which links the adapted episodes together.

Title ‡	Author	Date	ISBN
Star Trek Log One	Alan Dean Foster	June 1974	0-345-24014-6
Star Trek Log Two	Alan Dean Foster	September 1974	0-345-24184-3
Star Trek Log Three	Alan Dean Foster	January 1975	0-345-24260-2
Star Trek Log Four	Alan Dean Foster	May 1975	0-345-24435-4
Star Trek Log Five	Alan Dean Foster	July 1975	0-345-24532-6
Star Trek Log Six	Alan Dean Foster	May 1976	0-345-24655-1
Star Trek Log Seven	Alan Dean Foster	June 1976	0-345-24965-8
Star Trek Log Eight	Alan Dean Foster	August 1976	0-345-25141-5
Star Trek Log Nine	Alan Dean Foster	February 1977	0-345-25557-7
Star Trek Log Ten	Alan Dean Foster	January 1978	0-345-27212-9

==== Discount editions (1993) ====
Omnibus editions were released to discount book retailers and comics shops. Log Ten (1978) was excluded.

Title	Author	Date	ISBN
Star Trek Log One / Log Two / Log Three	Alan Dean Foster	January 1993	0-345-38247-1
Star Trek Log Four / Log Five / Log Six	Alan Dean Foster	July 1993	0-345-38522-5
Star Trek Log Seven / Log Eight / Log Nine	Alan Dean Foster	August 1993	0-345-38561-6

==== The Animated Series (1996) ====
Star Trek: The Animated Series omnibus editions of Star Trek Log were published by Del Rey Books as part of Star Trek's 30th Anniversary celebration. A serialized essay by Foster was included, in addition to revisions of several stories. Not all printings include a number stamp.

Vol.	Title (Note: Some printings include spelling corrections and unexplained prose changes.)	Author	Date	ISBN
1	Log One and Two	Alan Dean Foster	September 1996	0-345-40939-6
2	Log Three and Four	Alan Dean Foster	September 1996	0-345-40940-X
3	Log Five and Six	Alan Dean Foster	September 1996	0-345-40941-8
4	Log Seven and Eight	Alan Dean Foster	September 1996	0-345-40942-6
5	Log Nine and Ten	Alan Dean Foster	September 1996	0-345-40943-4

=== Gibraltar Library Binding (1977) ===
Illustrated middle-grade novels published exclusively for libraries as part of Random House's Gibraltar Library Binding service.

Title †^	Author(s)	Illustrator	Date	ISBN
The Truth Machine	Sharon Lerner and Christopher Cerf	Jane Clark	January 1977	0-394-83575-1
The Prisoner of Vega	Sharon Lerner	Robert Swanson	October 1977	0-394-83576-X

== Simon & Schuster (1979–present) ==
Notes:
- Novels are organized according to book line or flagship series, miniseries, and crossover series, then sorted by volume number and or release date.
- All novels are published as paperback editions, except where indicated.
- Many novels are listed more than once.

Simon & Schuster imprints known to have published Star Trek novels include Archway, Aladdin, Paula Wiseman, Wanderer, Minstrel, Byron Preiss, Wallaby, Weekly Reader, Pocket, Pocket Star, Viz, Simon Spotlight, Simon & Schuster Interactive, and Simon & Schuster Books for Young Readers. Imprints vary by book line, series, miniseries, printing, and market (e.g. country or language area).

=== Star Trek (1979–present) ===
Star Trek: The Original Series book line is based on the television series of the same name. From 1987 to 1996, Titan reprinted the numbered series for the United Kingdom market using a different scheme. Novels published since 2013 have included The Original Series subtitle.

==== Film novelizations (1979–1992) ====
Based on the Star Trek film series.

Title	Author(s)	Date	ISBN
Star Trek: The Motion Picture #	Gene Roddenberry	December 1979	0-671-83088-0
The Wrath of Khan #	Vonda N. McIntyre	July 1982	0-671-45610-5
The Search for Spock (Note: Similarly named works: The Search for Spock (1984), a film novelization by Vonda N. McIntyre; Search for Spock (2017), a puzzle book by Robb Pearlman.) ‡#	Vonda N. McIntyre	June 1984	0-671-49500-3
The Voyage Home (Note: Similarly named works: The Voyage Home (1986), a film novelization by Vonda N. McIntyre; The Voyage Home (1986), a young adult film novelization by Peter Lerangis.) ‡	Vonda N. McIntyre	December 1986	0-671-63266-3
The Final Frontier (Note: Similarly named works: Final Frontier (1988), a novel by Diane Carey; The Final Frontier (1989), a film novelization by J.M. Dillard.)	J. M. Dillard	June 1989	0-671-68008-0
The Undiscovered Country	J. M. Dillard	January 1992	0-671-75883-7

==== Numbered novels (1979–2002) ====
Numbered paperback releases:

No.	Title	Author(s)	Date	ISBN
1	Star Trek: The Motion Picture (novelization)	Gene Roddenberry	December 1979	0-671-83088-0
2	The Entropy Effect	Vonda N. McIntyre	June 1981	0-671-83692-7
3	The Klingon Gambit	Robert E. Vardeman	October 1981	0-671-83276-X
4	The Covenant of the Crown	Howard Weinstein	December 1981	0-671-83307-3
5	The Prometheus Design	Sondra Marshak and Myrna Culbreath	March 1982	0-671-83398-7
6	The Abode of Life	Lee Correy	May 1982	0-671-83297-2
7	The Wrath of Khan ‡ (novelization)	Vonda N. McIntyre	July 1982	0-671-45610-5
8	Black Fire	Sonni Cooper	January 1983	0-671-83632-3
9	Triangle	Sondra Marshak and Myrna Culbreath	March 1983	0-671-83399-5
10	Web of the Romulans	M. S. Murdock	June 1983	0-671-46479-5
11	Yesterday's Son (Yesterday Saga, Book 1)	A. C. Crispin	August 1983	0-671-47315-8
12	Mutiny on the Enterprise	Robert E. Vardeman	October 1983	0-671-46541-4
13	The Wounded Sky	Diane Duane	December 1983	0-671-47389-1
14	The Trellisane Confrontation	David Dvorkin	February 1984	0-671-46543-0
15	Corona	Greg Bear	April 1984	0-671-47390-5
16	The Final Reflection ‡ (Worlds Apart, Book 1)	John M. Ford	May 1984	0-671-47388-3
17	The Search for Spock ‡ (novelization)	Vonda N. McIntyre	June 1984	0-671-49500-3
18	My Enemy, My Ally ‡ (Rihannsu, Book 1)	Diane Duane	July 1984	0-671-50285-9
19	The Tears of the Singers	Melinda Snodgrass	September 1984	0-671-50284-0
20	The Vulcan Academy Murders	Jean Lorrah	November 1984	0-671-50054-6
21	Uhura's Song	Janet Kagan	January 1985	0-671-54730-5
22	Shadow Lord	Laurence Yep	March 1985	0-671-47392-1
23	Ishmael	Barbara Hambly	May 1985	0-671-55427-1
24	Killing Time	Della van Hise	July 1985	0-671-52488-7
25	Dwellers in the Crucible	Margaret Wander Bonanno	September 1985	0-671-60373-6
26	Pawns and Symbols	Majliss Larson	November 1985	0-671-55425-5
27	Mindshadow	J. M. Dillard	January 1986	0-671-60756-1
28	Crisis on Centaurus	Brad Ferguson	March 1986	0-671-61115-1
29	Dreadnought! (Fortunes of War, Book 1)	Diane Carey	May 1986	0-671-61873-3
30	Demons	J. M. Dillard	July 1986	0-671-62524-1
31	Battlestations! (Fortunes of War, Book 2)	Diane Carey	November 1986	0-671-63267-1
32	Chain of Attack	Gene DeWeese	February 1987	0-671-63269-8
33	Deep Domain	Howard Weinstein	April 1987	0-671-63329-5
34	Dreams of the Raven	Carmen Carter	June 1987	0-671-64500-5
35	The Romulan Way ‡ (Rihannsu, Book 2)	Diane Duane and Peter Morwood	August 1987	0-671-63498-4
36	How Much for Just the Planet? (Worlds Apart, Book 2)	John M. Ford	October 1987	0-671-62998-0
37	Bloodthirst	J. M. Dillard	December 1987	0-671-64489-0
38	The IDIC Epidemic	Jean Lorrah	February 1988	0-671-63574-3
39	Time for Yesterday (Yesterday Saga, Book 2)	A. C. Crispin	April 1988	0-671-60371-X
40	Timetrap	David Dvorkin	June 1988	0-671-64870-5
41	The Three-Minute Universe	Barbara Paul	August 1988	0-671-65816-6
42	Memory Prime ‡	Judith and Garfield Reeves-Stevens	October 1988	0-671-65813-1
43	The Final Nexus	Gene DeWeese	December 1988	0-671-66018-7
44	Vulcan's Glory	D. C. Fontana	February 1989	0-671-65667-8
45	Double, Double	Michael Jan Friedman	April 1989	0-671-66130-2
46	The Cry of the Onlies	Judy Klass	October 1989	0-671-68167-2
47	The Kobayashi Maru (Note: Similarly named novels: The Kobayashi Maru (1989), a novel by Julia Ecklar; Kobayashi Maru (2008), an Enterprise novel by Michael A. Martin and Andy Mangels.)	Julia Ecklar	December 1989	0-671-65817-4
48	Rules of Engagement	Peter Morwood	February 1990	0-671-66129-9
49	The Pandora Principle	Carolyn Clowes	April 1990	0-671-65815-8
50	Doctor's Orders	Diane Duane	June 1990	0-671-66189-2
51	Enemy Unseen	V. E. Mitchell	October 1990	0-671-68403-5
52	Home Is the Hunter	Dana Kramer-Rolls	December 1990	0-671-66662-2
53	Ghost-Walker	Barbara Hambly	February 1991	0-671-64398-3
54	A Flag Full of Stars (The Lost Years, Book 2)	Brad Ferguson (Note: As by Brad Ferguson. Uncredited rewrite completed by J.M. Dillard.)	April 1991	0-671-73918-2
55	Renegade	Gene DeWeese	June 1991	0-671-65814-X
56	Legacy	Michael Jan Friedman	August 1991	0-671-74468-2
57	The Rift	Peter David	November 1991	0-671-74796-7
58	Faces of Fire	Michael Jan Friedman	March 1992	0-671-74992-7
59	The Disinherited	Peter David, Michael Jan Friedman, and Robert Greenberger	May 1992	0-671-77958-3
60	Ice Trap	L. A. Graf	July 1992	0-671-78068-9
61	Sanctuary	John Vornholt	September 1992	0-671-76994-4
62	Death Count	L. A. Graf	November 1992	0-671-79322-5
63	Shell Game	Melissa Crandall	February 1993	0-671-79572-4
64	The Starship Trap	Mel Gilden	April 1993	0-671-79324-1
65	Windows on a Lost World	V. E. Mitchell	June 1993	0-671-79512-0
66	From the Depths	Victor Milan	August 1993	0-671-86911-6
67	The Great Starship Race	Diane Carey	October 1993	0-671-87250-8
68	Firestorm	L. A. Graf	January 1994	0-671-86588-9
69	The Patrian Transgression	Simon Hawke	April 1994	0-671-88044-6
70	Traitor Winds (The Lost Years, Book 3)	L. A. Graf	June 1994	0-671-86913-2
71	Crossroad	Barbara Hambly	September 1994	0-671-79323-3
72	The Better Man	Howard Weinstein	December 1994	0-671-86912-4
73	Recovery (The Lost Years, Book 4)	J. M. Dillard	March 1995	0-671-88342-9
74	The Fearful Summons	Denny Martin Flinn	June 1995	0-671-89007-7
75	First Frontier	Diane Carey and James Kirkland	August 1995	0-671-52045-8
76	The Captain's Daughter	Peter David	December 1995	0-671-52047-4
77	Twilight's End	Jerry Oltion	January 1996	0-671-53873-X
78	The Rings of Tautee	Dean Wesley Smith and Kristine Kathryn Rusch	May 1996	0-671-00171-X
79	First Strike ‡ (Invasion!, Book 1)	Diane Carey	July 1996	0-671-54002-5
80	The Joy Machine	Theodore Sturgeon and James Gunn	September 1996	0-671-00221-X
81	Mudd in Your Eye	Jerry Oltion	January 1997	0-671-00260-0
82	Mind Meld	John Vornholt	June 1997	0-671-00258-9
83	Heart of the Sun	Pamela Sargent and George Zebrowski	November 1997	0-671-00237-6
84	Assignment: Eternity	Greg Cox	January 1998	0-671-00117-5
85	Republic (My Brother's Keeper, Book 1)	Michael Jan Friedman	December 1998	0-671-01914-7
86	Constitution (My Brother's Keeper, Book 2)	Michael Jan Friedman	December 1998	0-671-01919-8
87	Enterprise (Note: Similarly named novels: Enterprise: The First Adventure (1986), a novel by Vonda N. McIntyre; Enterprise (1999), a novel by Michael Jan Friedman.) (My Brother's Keeper, Book 3)	Michael Jan Friedman	January 1999	0-671-01920-1
88	Across the Universe	Pamela Sargent and George Zebrowski	October 1999	0-671-01989-9
89	Wagon Train to the Stars (New Earth, Book 1)	Diane Carey	June 2000	0-671-04296-3
90	Belle Terre (New Earth, Book 2)	Dean Wesley Smith and Diane Carey	June 2000	0-671-04297-1
91	Rough Trails (New Earth, Book 3)	L. A. Graf	July 2000	0-671-03600-9
92	The Flaming Arrow (New Earth, Book 4)	Kathy Oltion and Jerry Oltion	July 2000	0-671-78562-1
93	Thin Air (New Earth, Book 5)	Kristine Kathryn Rusch and Dean Wesley Smith	August 2000	0-671-78577-X
94	Challenger (New Earth, Book 6)	Diane Carey	August 2000	0-671-04298-X
95	Swordhunt ‡ (Rihannsu, Book 3)	Diane Duane	October 2000	0-671-04209-2
96	Honor Blade ‡ (Rihannsu, Book 4)	Diane Duane	October 2000	0-671-04210-6
97	In the Name of Honor	Dayton Ward	January 20, 2002	0-7434-1225-7

==== Film tie-ins for children (1982–1986) ====
Published by Pocket Books. Some printings are badged as Wanderer, Minstrel, Archway, or Simon & Schuster Just for Boys.

Title ^	Author(s)	Date	ISBN
Star Trek II: Biographies	William Rotsler	December 1982	0-671-46391-8
Star Trek II: Short Stories	William Rotsler	December 1982	0-671-46390-X
Star Trek III: Short Stories	William Rotsler	May 1984	0-671-50139-9
Star Trek III: Search for Spock Storybook †	Larry Weinberg	June 1984	0-671-47662-9
The Voyage Home † (novelization)	Peter Lerangis	December 1986	0-671-63243-4

==== Original novels (1986–present) ====
Includes hardcover and paperback releases set within the continuity of the television series. Novels published before 2013 omitted The Original Series subtitle, with a few exceptions. Beginning with Allegiance in Exile (2013), most novels have maintained a shared continuity.

Title	Author(s)	Date	ISBN
Enterprise: The First Adventure	Vonda N. McIntyre	September 1986	0-671-62581-0
Strangers from the Sky	Margaret Wander Bonanno	July 1987	0-671-64049-6
Final Frontier	Diane Carey	January 1988	0-671-64752-0
Spock's World †‡	Diane Duane	September 1988	0-671-66851-X
The Lost Years † (The Lost Years, Book 1)	J. M. Dillard	October 1989	0-671-68293-8
Prime Directive †‡	Judith and Garfield Reeves Stevens	September 1990	0-671-70772-8
Probe †	Margaret Wander Bonanno (Note: As by Margaret Wander Bonanno. Uncredited rewrite by Gene DeWeese.)	April 1992	0-671-72420-7
Best Destiny †	Diane Carey	November 1992	0-671-79587-2
Shadows on the Sun †	Michael Jan Friedman	August 1993	0-671-71832-0
Sarek †‡	A. C. Crispin	March 1994	0-671-79561-9
Vulcan's Forge †	Josepha Sherman and Susan Shwartz	August 1997	0-671-00926-5
Vulcan's Heart †	Josepha Sherman and Susan Shwartz	July 1999	0-671-01544-3
The Last Roundup †	Christie Golden	June 25, 2002	0-7434-4909-6
Gemini	Mike W. Barr	January 25, 2003	0-7434-0074-7
Garth of Izar	Pamela Sargent and George Zebrowski	February 25, 2003	0-7434-0641-9
The Case of the Colonist's Corpse	Tony Isabella and Bob Ingersoll	December 30, 2003	0-7434-6497-4
Ex Machina	Christopher L. Bennett	December 28, 2004	0-7434-9285-4
Burning Dreams	Margaret Wander Bonanno	July 25, 2006	0-7434-9693-0
The Empty Chair (Rihannsu, Book 5)	Diane Duane	November 28, 2006	1-4165-0891-0
Troublesome Minds	Dave Galanter	May 26, 2009	978-1-4391-0155-1
Inception	S. D. Perry	January 26, 2010	978-0-7434-8250-9
Unspoken Truth	Margaret Wander Bonanno	March 30, 2010	978-1-4391-0219-0
The Children of Kings	Dave Stern	April 27, 2010	978-1-4391-5899-9
Cast No Shadow	James Swallow	July 26, 2011	978-1-4516-0717-8
A Choice of Catastrophes	Steve Mollmann and Michael Schuster	August 30, 2011	978-1-4516-0716-1
The Rings of Time ‡	Greg Cox	January 31, 2012	978-1-4516-5547-6
That Which Divides ‡	Dayton Ward	February 28, 2012	978-1-4516-5068-6
Allegiance in Exile	David R. George III	January 29, 2013	978-1-4767-0022-9
Devil's Bargain	Tony Daniel	February 26, 2013	978-1-4767-0047-2
The Weight of Worlds	Greg Cox	March 26, 2013	978-1-4767-0283-4
The Folded World	Jeff Mariotte	April 30, 2013	978-1-4767-0282-7
The Shocks of Adversity	William Leisner	May 28, 2013	978-1-4767-2240-5
From History's Shadow	Dayton Ward	July 30, 2013	978-1-4767-1900-9
No Time Like The Past	Greg Cox	February 25, 2014	978-1-4767-4949-5
Seasons of Light and Darkness ◊	Michael A. Martin	April 28, 2014	978-1-4767-3819-2
Serpents in the Garden	Jeff Mariotte	April 29, 2014	978-1-4767-4965-5
The More Things Change ◊	Scott Pearson	June 23, 2014	978-1-4767-6375-0
Foul Deeds Will Rise	Greg Cox	November 25, 2014	978-1-4767-8324-6
Savage Trade	Tony Daniel	February 24, 2015	978-1-4767-6550-1
Shadow of the Machine ◊	Scott Harrison	March 9, 2015	978-1-4767-5635-6
Crisis of Consciousness	Dave Galanter	April 28, 2015	978-1-4767-8260-7
Child of Two Worlds	Greg Cox	November 24, 2015	978-1-4767-8325-3
Miasma ◊ (novella)	Greg Cox	February 22, 2016	978-1-5011-2531-7
The Latter Fire	James Swallow	February 23, 2016	978-1-4767-8315-4
Elusive Salvation	Dayton Ward	April 26, 2016	978-1-5011-1129-7
The Face of the Unknown	Christopher L. Bennett	December 27, 2016	978-1-5011-3242-1
The Captain's Oath	Christopher L. Bennett	May 28, 2019	978-1-9821-1329-2
The Antares Maelstrom	Greg Cox	August 13, 2019	978-1-9821-1320-9
The Higher Frontier	Christopher L. Bennett	March 10, 2020	978-1-9821-3366-5
Agents of Influence	Dayton Ward	June 9, 2020	978-1-9821-3368-9
A Contest of Principles	Greg Cox	November 10, 2020	978-1-9821-3470-9
Living Memory	Christopher L. Bennett	June 15, 2021	978-1-9821-6589-5
Harm's Way (Note: Similarly named novels: Harm's Way (2022), a novel by David Mack; Harm's Way, Books 1–3, an unpublished three-volume series attributed to Jerry and Kathy Oltion.)	David Mack	December 13, 2022	978-1-6680-0866-9
Lost to Eternity	Greg Cox	July 23, 2024	978-1-6680-5005-7
Identity Theft	Greg Cox	December 2, 2025	978-1-6680-9662-8
Echoes in Eternity	David Mack	October 27, 2026	978-1-6682-3367-2

==== Starfleet Academy (1996) ====
Star Trek: Starfleet Academy young adult miniseries explores the lives of the Enterprise (NCC-1701) crew as Starfleet Academy cadets. Starfleet Academy (2010–2012) series is based on the Kelvin Universe films, and is unrelated. Starfleet Academy (1997), a video game novelization by Diane Carey, is also unrelated.

No.	Title ^	Author(s)	Date	ISBN
1	Crisis on Vulcan	Brad Strickland and Barbara Strickland	August 1996	0-671-00078-0
2	Aftershock	John Vornholt	September 1996	0-671-00079-9
3	Cadet Kirk	Diane Carey	October 1996	0-671-00077-2

==== Eugenics Wars (2001–2005) ====
Star Trek: The Eugenics Wars miniseries explores the life of Khan Noonien Singh on Ceti Alpha V. The series was developed by Greg Cox and John J. Ordover.

Title †	Author	Date	ISBN
The Rise and Fall of Khan Noonien Singh, Volume One	Greg Cox	June 26, 2001	0-671-02127-3
The Rise and Fall of Khan Noonien Singh, Volume Two	Greg Cox	April 23, 2002	0-7434-0643-5
To Reign in Hell: The Exile of Khan Noonien Singh	Greg Cox	January 4, 2005	0-7434-5711-0

==== Janus Gate (2002) ====
Star Trek: The Janus Gate miniseries follows the events of "The Naked Time".

No.	Title	Author	Date	ISBN
1	Present Tense	L. A. Graf	May 21, 2002	0-671-03635-1
2	Future Imperfect	L. A. Graf	May 21, 2002	0-671-03636-X
3	Past Prologue	L. A. Graf	June 25, 2002	0-7434-4596-1

==== Errand of Vengeance (2002) ====
Star Trek: Errand of Vengeance miniseries is a retelling of Enterprise (NCC-1701)'s "Five Year" mission from an undercover Klingon agent's point of view.

No.	Title	Author	Date	ISBN
1	The Edge of the Sword (Note: The Edge of the Sword (2002), by Kevin Ryan, was initially marketed as Sword's Point. Variants were released to e-book distributors and libraries which include the Sword's Point title on the cover.)	Kevin Ryan	June 25, 2002	0-7434-4598-8
2	Killing Blow	Kevin Ryan	July 30, 2002	0-7434-4602-X
3	River of Blood	Kevin Ryan	July 30, 2002	0-7434-4600-3

==== Vulcan's Soul (2004–2007) ====
Star Trek: Vulcan's Soul miniseries follows Spock's life after The Next Generation episode "Unification".

No.	Title †	Author(s)	Date	ISBN
1	Exodus	Josepha Sherman and Susan Shwartz	July 20, 2004	0-7434-6356-0
2	Exiles	Josepha Sherman and Susan Shwartz	June 20, 2006	0-7434-6359-5
3	Epiphany	Josepha Sherman and Susan Shwartz	April 17, 2007	978-0-7434-6362-1

==== Errand of Fury (2005–2008) ====
Star Trek: Errand of Fury miniseries is a continuation of Errand of Vengeance (2002).

No.	Title	Author	Date	ISBN
1	Seeds of Rage	Kevin Ryan	March 29, 2005	0-7434-8053-8
2	Demands of Honor	Kevin Ryan	January 30, 2007	978-0-7434-8054-3
3	Sacrifices of War	Kevin Ryan	December 30, 2008	978-0-7434-9720-6

==== Mere Anarchy (2006–07) ====
Star Trek: Mere Anarchy miniseries explores the effects of an off-world disaster on the crew of the Enterprise over a thirty-year period. Inspired by the W. B. Yeats poem "The Second Coming". Published as ebook exclusives. An omnibus edition was published in 2009.

No.	Title ◊	Author(s)	Date (Note: Exact date of release is not known, or not available via primary sources. Approximated to the nearest month.)	ISBN
1	Things Fall Apart	Dayton Ward and Kevin Dilmore	August 2006	1-4165-3437-7
2	The Centre Cannot Hold	Mike W. Barr	September 2006	1-4165-3436-9
3	Shadows of the Indignant	Dave Galanter	October 2006	1-4165-3453-9
4	The Darkness Drops Again	Christopher L. Bennett	February 2007	978-1-4165-3452-5
5	The Blood-Dimmed Tide	Howard Weinstein	March 2007	978-1-4165-3451-8
6	Its Hour Come Round	Margaret Wander Bonanno	April 2007	978-1-4165-3454-9

==== Crucible (2006–07) ====
Star Trek: Crucible miniseries focusing on the triumvirate of McCoy, Spock, and Kirk. An omnibus edition including new material was announced in 2008 but was cancelled in 2011. The cover art by John Picacio forms a triptych.

No.	Title	Author	Date	ISBN
1	Provenance of Shadows (Note: Also published as McCoy: Provenance of Shadows.)	David R. George III	August 29, 2006	0-7434-9168-8
2	The Fire and the Rose (Note: Also published as Spock: The Fire and the Rose.)	David R. George III	November 28, 2006	0-7434-9169-6
3	The Star to Every Wandering (Note: Also published as Kirk: The Star to Every Wandering.)	David R. George III	February 27, 2007	978-0-7434-9170-9

==== Legacies (2016) ====
Star Trek: Legacies miniseries was published as part of Star Trek's 50th Anniversary celebration. The novels feature characters from other booklines.

No.	Title	Author(s)	Date	ISBN
1	Captain to Captain	Greg Cox	June 28, 2016	978-1-5011-2529-4
2	Best Defense	David Mack	July 26, 2016	978-1-4767-5310-2
3	Purgatory's Key	Dayton Ward and Kevin Dilmore	August 30, 2016	978-1-5011-2277-4

=== The Next Generation (1988–2024) ===

Star Trek: The Next Generation book line is based on the television series of the same name. The book line was relaunched with the publication of Death in Winter (2005), by Michael Jan Friedman.

==== Episode novelizations (1987–1994) ====
Based on select episodes from the television series.

Title	Author(s)	Date	ISBN
Encounter at Farpoint	David Gerrold	September 1987	0-671-65241-9
Unification	Jeri Taylor	December 1991	0-671-77056-X
Relics	Michael Jan Friedman	November 1992	0-671-86476-9
Descent	Diane Carey	October 1993	0-671-88267-8
All Good Things... †	Michael Jan Friedman	June 1994	0-671-71898-3

==== Numbered novels (1988–2001) ====
Numbered paperback releases:

No.	Title	Author(s)	Date	ISBN
1	Ghost Ship	Diane Carey	July 1988	0-671-66579-0
2	The Peacekeepers	Gene DeWeese	September 1988	0-671-66929-X
3	The Children of Hamlin	Carmen Carter	November 1988	0-671-67319-X
4	Survivors	Jean Lorrah	January 1989	0-671-67438-2
5	Strike Zone	Peter David	March 1989	0-671-67940-6
6	Power Hungry	Howard Weinstein	May 1989	0-671-67714-4
7	Masks	John Vornholt	July 1989	0-671-67980-5
8	The Captain's Honor	David Dvorkin and Daniel Dvorkin	September 1989	0-671-68487-6
9	A Call to Darkness	Michael Jan Friedman	November 1989	0-671-68708-5
10	A Rock and a Hard Place	Peter David	January 1990	0-671-69364-6
11	Gulliver's Fugitives	Keith Sharee	May 1990	0-671-70130-4
12	Doomsday World	Carmen Carter, Peter David, Michael Jan Friedman, and Robert Greenberger	July 1990	0-671-70237-8
13	The Eyes of the Beholders	A. C. Crispin	September 1990	0-671-70010-3
14	Exiles	Howard Weinstein	November 1990	0-671-70560-1
15	Fortune's Light	Michael Jan Friedman	January 1991	0-671-70836-8
16	Contamination	John Vornholt	March 1991	0-671-70561-X
17	Boogeymen	Mel Gilden	July 1991	0-671-70970-4
18	Q-in-Law	Peter David	October 1991	0-671-73389-3
19	Perchance to Dream	Howard Weinstein	December 1991	0-671-70837-6
20	Spartacus	T. L. Mancour	February 1992	0-671-76051-3
21	Chains of Command	Bill McCay and Eloise Flood	April 1992	0-671-74264-7
22	Imbalance	V. E. Mitchell	June 1992	0-671-77571-5
23	War Drums	John Vornholt	October 1992	0-671-79236-9
24	Nightshade	Laurell K. Hamilton	December 1992	0-671-79566-X
25	Grounded	David Bischoff	March 1993	0-671-79747-6
26	The Romulan Prize	Simon Hawke	May 1993	0-671-79746-8
27	Guises of the Mind	Rebecca Neason	September 1993	0-671-79831-6
28	Here There Be Dragons	John Peel	December 1993	0-671-86571-4
29	Sins of Commission	Susan Wright	April 1994	0-671-79704-2
30	Debtors' Planet	W. R. Thompson	May 1994	0-671-88341-0
31	Foreign Foes	Dave Galanter and Greg Brodeur	August 1994	0-671-88414-X
32	Requiem	Michael Jan Friedman and Kevin Ryan	October 1994	0-671-79567-8
33	Balance of Power	Dafydd ab Hugh	January 1995	0-671-52003-2
34	Blaze of Glory	Simon Hawke	March 1995	0-671-88045-4
35	The Romulan Stratagem	Robert Greenberger	May 1995	0-671-87997-9
36	Into the Nebula	Gene DeWeese	July 1995	0-671-89453-6
37	The Last Stand	Brad Ferguson	October 1995	0-671-50105-4
38	Dragon's Honor	Kij Johnson and Greg Cox	January 1996	0-671-50107-0
39	Rogue Saucer	John Vornholt	March 1996	0-671-54917-0
40	Possession	J. M. Dillard and Kathleen O'Malley	May 1996	0-671-86485-8
41	The Soldiers of Fear ‡ (Invasion!, Book 2)	Dean Wesley Smith and Kristine Kathryn Rusch	July 1996	0-671-54174-9
42	Infiltrator	W. R. Thompson	September 1996	0-671-56831-0
43	A Fury Scorned	Pamela Sargent and George Zebrowski	November 1996	0-671-52703-7
44	The Death of Princes	John Peel	January 1997	0-671-56808-6
45	Intellivore	Diane Duane	April 1997	0-671-56832-9
46	To Storm Heaven	Esther Friesner	December 1997	0-671-56838-8
47	Q-Space ‡ (The Q Continuum, Book 1)	Greg Cox	August 1998	0-671-01915-5
48	Q-Zone ‡ (The Q Continuum, Book 2)	Greg Cox	August 1998	0-671-01921-X
49	Q-Strike ‡ (The Q Continuum, Book 3)	Greg Cox	September 1998	0-671-01922-8
50	Dyson Sphere	Charles Pellegrino and George Zebrowski	April 1999	0-671-54173-0
51	Infection ‡ (Double Helix, Book 1)	John Gregory Betancourt	June 1999	0-671-03255-0
52	Vectors ‡ (Double Helix, Book 2)	Dean Wesley Smith and Kristine Kathryn Rusch	June 1999	0-671-03256-9
53	Red Sector ‡ (Double Helix, Book 3)	Diane Carey	July 1999	0-671-03257-7
54	Quarantine (Note: Similarly named novels: Quarantine (1999), a The Next Generation novel by John Vornholt; Quarantine (1997), a Voyager young adult novel by Patricia Barnes-Svarney.) ‡ (Double Helix, Book 4)	John Vornholt	July 1999	0-671-03477-4
55	Double or Nothing ‡ (Double Helix, Book 5)	Peter David	August 1999	0-671-03478-2
56	The First Virtue ‡ (Double Helix, Book 6)	Michael Jan Friedman and Christie Golden	August 1999	0-671-03258-5
57	The Forgotten War	William R. Forstchen	September 1999	0-671-01159-6
58	Gemworld, Book One	John Vornholt	February 2000	0-671-04270-X
59	Gemworld, Book Two	John Vornholt	February 2000	0-671-04271-8
60	Tooth and Claw	Doranna Durgin	January 30, 2001	0-671-04211-4
61	Diplomatic Implausibility	Keith DeCandido	January 30, 2001	0-671-78554-0
62	Dead Zone (Maximum Warp, Book 1)	Dave Galanter and Greg Brodeur	February 27, 2001	0-671-04749-3
63	Forever Dark (Maximum Warp, Book 2)	Dave Galanter and Greg Brodeur	February 27, 2001	0-671-04757-4

==== Original novels (1990–2003) ====
Includes hardcover and paperback releases set within the continuity of The Next Generation television series:

Title	Author(s)	Date	ISBN
Metamorphosis	Jean Lorrah	March 1990	0-671-68402-7
Vendetta	Peter David	May 1991	0-671-74145-4
Reunion †‡	Michael Jan Friedman	November 1991	0-671-74808-4
Imzadi †‡	Peter David	August 1992	0-671-79197-4
The Devil's Heart †	Carmen Carter	April 1993	0-671-79325-X
Dark Mirror †	Diane Duane	December 1993	0-671-79377-2
Q-Squared †	Peter David	July 1994	0-671-89152-9
Crossover †	Michael Jan Friedman	November 1995	0-671-89677-6
Kahless †	Michael Jan Friedman	July 1996	0-671-54779-8
Ship of the Line (Note: Similarly named works: Ship of the Line (1997), a novel by Diane Carey; Ships of the Line (2006), a fictional reference by Michael Okuda.) †	Diane Carey	October 1997	0-671-00924-9
The Best and the Brightest (Note: Cataloged as part of the Starfleet Academy meta-series by Memory Alpha and Internet Speculative Fiction Database.)	Susan Wright	February 1998	0-671-01549-4
Planet X (Note: Planet X (1998), by Michael Jan Friedman, is a franchise crossover novel of Marvel's X-Men and The Next Generation.) (X-Men)	Michael Jan Friedman	May 1998	0-671-01916-3
Triangle: Imzadi II †‡	Peter David	December 1998	0-671-02532-5
I, Q †	John de Lancie and Peter David	September 1999	0-671-02443-4
The Valiant †‡	Michael Jan Friedman	April 2000	0-671-77522-7
Immortal Coil	Jeffrey Lang	January 29, 2002	0-7434-0592-7
A Hard Rain	Dean Wesley Smith	February 26, 2002	0-7434-1926-X
The Battle of Betazed	Charlotte Douglas and Susan Kearney	April 2, 2002	0-7434-3434-X
Do Comets Dream?	S. P. Somtow	June 6, 2003	0-7434-6500-8
Shadows Have Offended	Cassandra Rose Clarke	July 13, 2021	978-1-9821-5404-2
Pliable Truths	Dayton Ward	May 21, 2024	978-1-6680-4641-8

==== Starfleet Academy (1993–1998) ====
Star Trek: The Next Generation – Starfleet Academy young adult series explores the lives of the Enterprise (NCC-1701-D) crew as Starfleet Academy cadets. Starfleet Academy (1997), a video game novelization by Diane Carey, is unrelated. The Best and the Brightest (1998), by Susan Wright, is thematically similar to the series. Novellas written by Peter David tie into New Frontier (1997–2015).

No.	Title ^	Author(s)	Date	ISBN
1	Worf's First Adventure	Peter David	August 1993	0-671-87084-X
2	Line of Fire	Peter David	October 1993	0-671-87085-8
3	Survival	Peter David	December 1993	0-671-87086-6
4	Capture the Flag	John Vornholt	June 1994	0-671-87998-7
5	Atlantis Station	V. E. Mitchell	August 1994	0-671-88449-2
6	Mystery of the Missing Crew	Michael Jan Friedman	February 1995	0-671-50108-9
7	Secret of the Lizard People	Michael Jan Friedman	April 1995	0-671-50109-7
8	Starfall	Brad and Barbara Strickland	October 1995	0-671-51010-X
9	Nova Command	Brad and Barbara Strickland	December 1995	0-671-51009-6
10	Loyalties	Patricia Barnes-Svarney	April 1996	0-671-55280-5
11	Crossfire	John Vornholt	December 1996	0-671-55305-4
12	Breakaway	Bobbi J.G. Weiss and David Cody Weiss	April 1997	0-671-00226-0
13	The Haunted Starship	Brad Ferguson	December 1997	0-671-01432-3
14	Deceptions	Bobbi J.G. Weiss and David Cody Weiss	April 1998	0-671-01723-3

==== Film novelizations (1994–2002) ====
Based on The Next Generation film series.

Title †	Author	Date	ISBN
Star Trek Generations	J. M. Dillard	December 1994	0-671-51742-2
Star Trek: First Contact	J. M. Dillard	December 1996	0-671-00316-X
Star Trek: Insurrection	J. M. Dillard	December 1998	0-671-02447-7
Star Trek Nemesis	J. M. Dillard	December 10, 2002	0-7434-5772-2

==== Young adult film novelizations (1994–2002) ====
Film novelizations intended for younger readers.

Title ^	Author	Date	ISBN
Star Trek Generations	John Vornholt	December 1994	0-671-51901-8
Star Trek: First Contact	John Vornholt	December 1996	0-671-00128-0
Star Trek: Insurrection	John Vornholt	December 1998	0-671-02107-9
Star Trek Nemesis	John Vornholt	December 10, 2002	0-7434-6159-2

==== Genesis Wave (2000–2003) ====
Star Trek: The Next Generation – The Genesis Wave miniseries follows the crew of the Enterprise as they attempt to prevent the weaponization of the Genesis Device.

Title †	Author	Date	ISBN
The Genesis Wave, Book One	John Vornholt	August 29, 2000	0-7434-1180-3
The Genesis Wave, Book Two	John Vornholt	April 3, 2001	0-7434-1181-1
The Genesis Wave, Book Three	John Vornholt	January 2, 2002	0-7434-4375-6
Genesis Force	John Vornholt	June 18, 2003	0-7434-6503-2

==== Maximum Warp (2001) ====
Star Trek: The Next Generation – Maximum Warp miniseries follows the crew of the Enterprise as they search for a solution to a disruption in subspace which prevents warp travel. The titles do not appear on the cover art, only the series name and book number.

No.	Title #	Author(s)	Date	ISBN
1	Dead Zone	Dave Galanter and Greg Brodeur	February 27, 2001	0-671-04749-3
2	Forever Dark	Dave Galanter and Greg Brodeur	February 27, 2001	0-671-04757-4

==== A Time to... (2004) ====
Star Trek: A Time to... crossover miniseries explores events prior to Nemesis (2002). Conceived by John J. Ordover, and edited by Keith DeCandido. Originally intended to be a sequence of twelve novels. Not all printings include a number stamp.

No.	Title	Author(s)	Date	ISBN
1	A Time to Be Born	John Vornholt	January 27, 2004	0-7434-6765-5
2	A Time to Die	John Vornholt	February 24, 2004	0-7434-6766-3
3	A Time to Sow	Dayton Ward and Kevin Dilmore	March 30, 2004	0-7434-8299-9
4	A Time to Harvest	Dayton Ward and Kevin Dilmore	April 27, 2004	0-7434-8298-0
5	A Time to Love	Robert Greenberger	May 25, 2004	0-7434-6285-8
6	A Time to Hate	Robert Greenberger	June 29, 2004	0-7434-6289-0
7	A Time to Kill	David Mack	July 27, 2004	0-7434-9177-7
8	A Time to Heal	David Mack	August 31, 2004	0-7434-9178-5
9	A Time for War, a Time for Peace	Keith DeCandido	September 28, 2004	0-7434-9179-3

==== Relaunch novels (2005–2019) ====
Interlinked novels set after the film Nemesis (2002):

Title	Author(s)	Date	ISBN
Death in Winter †	Michael Jan Friedman	September 20, 2005	0-7434-9721-X
The Buried Age	Christopher L. Bennett	June 26, 2007	978-1-4165-3739-7
Resistance	J. M. Dillard	August 28, 2007	978-0-7434-9955-2
Q & A	Keith DeCandido	September 25, 2007	978-1-4165-2741-1
Before Dishonor	Peter David	October 30, 2007	978-1-4165-2742-8
Greater than the Sum	Christopher L. Bennett	July 29, 2008	978-1-4165-7132-2
Losing the Peace	William Leisner	June 30, 2009	978-1-4391-0786-7
Indistinguishable From Magic	David A. McIntee	March 29, 2011	978-1-4516-0615-7
The Stuff of Dreams ◊	James Swallow	March 25, 2013	978-1-4516-9661-5
The Light Fantastic	Jeffrey Lang	June 24, 2014	978-1-4767-5051-4
Q Are Cordially Uninvited... ◊	Rudy Josephs	October 6, 2014	978-1-4767-7882-2
Takedown	John Jackson Miller	January 27, 2015	978-1-4767-8271-3
Armageddon's Arrow	Dayton Ward	May 26, 2015	978-1-4767-8269-0
Headlong Flight	Dayton Ward	January 31, 2017	978-1-5011-1131-0
Hearts and Minds	Dayton Ward	May 30, 2017	978-1-5011-4731-9
Available Light	Dayton Ward	April 9, 2019	978-1-9821-1327-8
Collateral Damage	David Mack	October 8, 2019	978-1-9821-1358-2

==== Slings and Arrows (2007–08) ====
Star Trek: The Next Generation – Slings and Arrows miniseries explores events between Generations (1994) and First Contact (1996). Published as ebook exclusives.

No.	Title ◊	Author(s)	Date	ISBN
1	A Sea of Troubles	J. Steven York and Christina F. York	October 1, 2007	978-1-4165-5008-2
2	The Oppressor's Wrong	Phaedra M. Weldon	November 7, 2007	978-1-4165-5013-6
3	The Insolence of Office	William Leisner	December 1, 2007	978-1-4165-5022-8
4	That Sleep of Death	Terri Osborne	January 14, 2008	978-1-4165-5024-2
5	A Weary Life	Robert Greenberger	February 1, 2008	978-1-4165-5026-6
6	Enterprises of Great Pitch and Moment	Keith DeCandido	March 11, 2008	978-1-4165-5027-3

==== Cold Equations (2012) ====
Star Trek: The Next Generation – Cold Equations relaunch miniseries explores the effect artificial life has on Starfleet and the Federation.

No.	Title	Author	Date	ISBN
1	The Persistence of Memory	David Mack	October 30, 2012	978-1-4516-5072-3
2	Silent Weapons	David Mack	November 27, 2012	978-1-4516-5073-0
3	The Body Electric	David Mack	December 26, 2012	978-1-4516-5074-7

=== Deep Space Nine (1993–present) ===

Star Trek: Deep Space Nine book line is based on the television series of the same name. The book line was relaunched with the publication of three thematically linked works: the short story collection Lives of Dax (1999), edited by Marco Palmieri; A Stitch in Time (2000), by Andrew J. Robinson; and the two-part novel Avatar (2001), by S. D. Perry.

==== Episode novelizations (1993–1999) ====
Based on select episodes from the television series. Call to Arms (1998) and Sacrifice of Angels (1998) are adaptations of the seven episode arc from Deep Space Nine's fifth and sixth beginning with "Call to Arms" and ending with "Sacrifice to Angels".

Title	Author(s)	Date	ISBN
Emissary #	J. M. Dillard	February 1993	0-671-79858-8
The Search	Diane Carey	October 1994	0-671-50604-8
The Way of the Warrior	Diane Carey	October 1995	0-671-56813-2
Trials and Tribble-ations	Diane Carey	December 1996	0-671-00902-8
Far Beyond the Stars	Steven Barnes	April 1998	0-671-02430-2
Call to Arms (The Dominion War, Book 2)	Diane Carey	November 1998	0-671-02497-3
Sacrifice of Angels (The Dominion War, Book 4)	Diane Carey	December 1998	0-671-02498-1
What You Leave Behind	Diane Carey	June 1999	0-671-03476-6

==== Numbered novels (1993–2000) ====
Numbered paperback releases:

No.	Title	Author(s)	Date	ISBN
1	Emissary (novelization)	J. M. Dillard	February 1993	0-671-79858-8
2	The Siege	Peter David	May 1993	0-671-87083-1
3	Bloodletter	K. W. Jeter	August 1993	0-671-87275-3
4	The Big Game	Sandy Schofield	November 1993	0-671-88030-6
5	Fallen Heroes	Dafydd ab Hugh	February 1994	0-671-88459-X
6	Betrayal	Lois Tilton	May 1994	0-671-88117-5
7	Warchild	Esther Friesner	September 1994	0-671-88116-7
8	Antimatter	John Vornholt	November 1994	0-671-88560-X
9	Proud Helios	Melissa Scott	February 1995	0-671-88390-9
10	Valhalla	Nathan Archer	April 1995	0-671-88115-9
11	Devil in the Sky	Greg Cox and John Gregory Betancourt	June 1995	0-671-88114-0
12	The Laertian Gamble	Robert Sheckley	September 1995	0-671-88690-8
13	Station Rage	Diane Carey	November 1995	0-671-88561-8
14	The Long Night	Dean Wesley Smith and Kristine Kathryn Rusch	February 1996	0-671-55165-5
15	Objective: Bajor	John Peel	June 1996	0-671-56811-6
16	Time's Enemy ‡ (Invasion!, Book 3)	L. A. Graf	August 1996	0-671-54150-1
17	The Heart of the Warrior	John Gregory Betancourt	October 1996	0-671-00239-2
18	Saratoga	Michael Jan Friedman	November 1996	0-671-56897-3
19	The Tempest	Susan Wright	February 1997	0-671-00227-9
20	Wrath of the Prophets	Peter David, Michael Jan Friedman, and Robert Greenberger	May 1997	0-671-53817-9
21	Trial by Error	Mark Garland	November 1997	0-671-00251-1
22	Vengeance	Dafydd ab Hugh	February 1998	0-671-00468-9
23	The 34th Rule	Armin Shimerman and David R. George III	January 1999	0-671-00793-9
24	The Conquered (Rebels, Book 1)	Dafydd ab Hugh	February 1999	0-671-01140-5
25	The Courageous (Rebels, Book 2)	Dafydd ab Hugh	February 1999	0-671-01141-3
26	The Liberated (Rebels, Book 3)	Dafydd ab Hugh	March 1999	0-671-01142-1
27	A Stitch in Time (Note: Status as a Deep Space Nine relaunch novel is disputed among primary sources.)	Andrew J. Robinson	May 2000	0-671-03885-0

==== Young adult novellas (1994–1998) ====
Star Trek: Deep Space Nine young adult series follows the adventures of Jake Sisko and Nog while living aboard Deep Space Nine.

No.	Title ^	Author(s)	Date	ISBN
1	The Star Ghost	Brad Strickland	February 1994	0-671-87999-5
2	Stowaways	Brad Strickland	April 1994	0-671-88000-4
3	Prisoners of Peace	John Peel	October 1994	0-671-88288-0
4	The Pet	Mel Gilden and Ted Pedersen	December 1994	0-671-88352-6
5	Arcade	Diana Gallagher	June 1995	0-671-89678-4
6	Field Trip	John Peel	August 1995	0-671-88287-2
7	Gypsy World	Ted Pedersen	February 1996	0-671-51115-7
8	Highest Score	Kem Antilles	June 1996	0-671-89936-8
9	Cardassian Imps	Mel Gilden	February 1997	0-671-51116-5
10	Space Camp	Ted Pedersen	June 1997	0-671-00730-0
11	Honor Bound (Note: Similarly named novels: Honor Bound (1997), a Deep Space Nine young adult novella by Diana G. Gallagher; Honor Bound (2003), an I.K.S. Gorkon novel by Keith DeCandido.) ‡ (Day of Honor)	Diana G. Gallagher	October 1997	0-671-01452-8
12	Trapped in Time	Ted Pedersen	February 1998	0-671-01440-4

==== Original novels (1995–present) ====
Includes hardcover and paperback releases set within the continuity of the Deep Space Nine television series:

Title	Author(s)	Date	ISBN
Warped (Note: Similarly named works: Warped (1995), a Deep Space Nine novel by K. W. Jeter; Warped (2015), a The Next Generation parody episode guide by Mike McMahan.) †	K. W. Jeter	March 1995	0-671-87252-4
Hollow Men	Una McCormack	April 26, 2005	0-7434-9151-3
Revenant	Alex White	December 21, 2021	978-1-9821-6082-1
The Peacemakers	Una McCormack	August 4, 2026	978-1-6680-9693-2

==== Millennium (2000) ====
Star Trek: Deep Space Nine – Millennium miniseries explores an alternate-timeline accidentally created by the crew of the Defiant. The series was partially adapted as The Fallen (2000), a third-person shooter video game developed by The Collective. An omnibus edition was published in 2002. (Note: Similarly named novels: Millennium (2002), a Deep Space Nine omnibus edition by Judith and Garfield Reeves-Stevens; Millennium, an unpublished two-part novel attributed to L. A. Graf.)

No.	Title	Author(s)	Date	ISBN
1	The Fall of Terok Nor	Judith and Garfield Reeves-Stevens	March 2000	0-671-02401-9
2	The War of the Prophets	Judith and Garfield Reeves-Stevens	March 2000	0-671-02402-7
3	Inferno	Judith and Garfield Reeves-Stevens	April 2000	0-671-02403-5

==== Relaunch novels (2001–2017) ====
Interlinked novels set after the episode "What You Leave Behind". The Lives of Dax (2001), a short story collection edited by Marco Palmieri, and A Stitch in Time (2000), by Andrew J. Robinson, are linked to the relaunch.

Title	Author(s)	Date	ISBN
Avatar, Book One ‡	S. D. Perry	May 1, 2001	0-7434-0050-X
Avatar, Book Two ‡	S. D. Perry	May 1, 2001	0-7434-0051-8
Rising Son	S. D. Perry	December 31, 2002	0-7434-4838-3
The Left Hand of Destiny, Book One	J. G. Hertzler and Jeffrey Lang	April 1, 2003	0-7434-2328-3
The Left Hand of Destiny, Book Two	J. G. Hertzler and Jeffrey Lang	April 23, 2003	0-7434-2329-1
Unity †	S. D. Perry	November 18, 2003	0-7434-4840-5
Warpath	David Mack	March 28, 2006	1-4165-0775-2
Fearful Symmetry (Note: Similarly named novels: Fearful Symmetry (2008), a Deep Space Nine novel by Olivia Woods; Fearful Symmetry, an unpublished novel attributed to Kevin Ryan.)	Olivia Woods	June 24, 2008	978-1-4165-6781-3
The Soul Key	Olivia Woods	July 28, 2009	978-1-4391-0792-8
The Never-Ending Sacrifice	Una McCormack	August 25, 2009	978-1-4391-0961-8
Lust's Latinum Lost (and Found) ◊	Paula M. Block and Terry J. Erdmann	September 1, 2014	978-1-4767-7931-7
The Missing	Una McCormack	December 30, 2014	978-1-4767-5023-1
Sacraments of Fire	David R. George III	June 30, 2015	978-1-4767-5633-2
Ascendance	David R. George III	December 29, 2015	978-1-5011-0370-4
Force and Motion	Jeffrey Lang	May 31, 2016	978-1-5011-1073-3
Rules of Accusation ◊	Paula M. Block and Terry J. Erdmann	July 4, 2016	978-1-5011-1068-9
The Long Mirage	David R. George III	February 28, 2017	978-1-5011-3297-1
Enigma Tales	Una McCormack	June 27, 2017	978-1-5011-5258-0
I, The Constable ◊	Paula M. Block and Terry J. Erdmann	November 13, 2017	978-1-5011-6974-8

==== Mission Gamma (2002) ====
Star Trek: Deep Space Nine – Mission Gamma relaunch miniseries follows the crew of the Defiant under the command of Elias Vaughn. These Haunted Seas (2008) omnibus collects Twilight (2002) and This Gray Spirit (2002). The cover art by Cliff Nielsen forms a polyptych. Original Sin (2017), by David R. George III, has a similar premise.

No.	Title	Author(s)	Date	ISBN
1	Twilight ‡	David R. George III	August 27, 2002	0-7434-4560-0
2	This Gray Spirit ‡	Heather Jarman	August 27, 2002	0-7434-4562-7
3	Cathedral	Michael A. Martin and Andy Mangels	October 1, 2002	0-7434-4564-3
4	Lesser Evil	Robert Simpson	October 29, 2002	0-7434-1024-6

==== Worlds of Deep Space Nine (2004–05) ====
Worlds of Star Trek: Deep Space Nine relaunch series explores the home worlds of the crew and residents of Deep Space Nine. The series was edited by Marco Palmieri.

No.	Title	Author(s)	Date	ISBN
1	Cardassia and Andor	Una McCormack and Heather Jarman	May 25, 2004	0-7434-8351-0
2	Trill and Bajor	Andy Mangels, Michael A. Martin and J. Noah Kym	January 25, 2005	0-7434-8352-9
3	The Dominion and Ferenginar	David R. George III and Keith DeCandido	January 25, 2005	0-7434-8353-7

==== Gamma (2017) ====
Star Trek: Deep Space Nine – Gamma relaunch miniseries follows the crew of Robinson (NCC-71842) under the command of Benjamin Sisko. Only one novel has been published. Mission Gamma (2002) has a similar premise.

Title	Author	Date	ISBN
Original Sin	David R. George III	September 26, 2017	978-1-5011-3322-0

=== Voyager (1995–2020) ===

Star Trek: Voyager book line is based on the television series of the same name. The book line was relaunched with the publication of Homecoming (2003), by Christie Golden.

==== Episode novelizations (1995–2001) ====
Based on select episodes from the television series:

Title	Author(s)	Date	ISBN
Caretaker #	L. A. Graf	February 1995	0-671-51914-X
Flashback	Diane Carey	October 1996	0-671-00383-6
Day of Honor: The Television Episode ‡ (Day of Honor)	Michael Jan Friedman	January 1997	0-671-01981-3
Equinox	Diane Carey	October 1999	0-671-04295-5
Endgame (Note: Similarly named novels: End Game (1997), a New Frontier novel by Peter David; Endgame (2001), a Voyager episode novelization by Diane Carey.)	Diane Carey	June 26, 2001	0-7434-4216-4

==== Numbered novels (1995–2000) ====
Numbered paperback releases:

No.	Title	Author(s)	Date	ISBN
1	Caretaker (novelization)	L. A. Graf	February 1995	0-671-51914-X
2	The Escape	Dean Wesley Smith and Kristine Kathryn Rusch	May 1995	0-671-52096-2
3	Ragnarok	Nathan Archer	July 1995	0-671-52044-X
4	Violations	Susan Wright	September 1995	0-671-52046-6
5	Incident at Arbuk	John Gregory Betancourt	November 1995	0-671-52048-2
6	The Murdered Sun	Christie Golden	February 1996	0-671-53783-0
7	Ghost of a Chance	Mark A. Garland and Charles G. McGraw	April 1996	0-671-56798-5
8	Cybersong	S. N. Lewitt	May 1996	0-671-56783-7
9	The Final Fury ‡ (Invasion!, Book 4)	Dafydd ab Hugh	August 1996	0-671-54181-1
10	Bless the Beasts	Karen Haber	November 1996	0-671-56780-2
11	The Garden	Melissa Scott	February 1997	0-671-56799-3
12	Chrysalis	David Niall Wilson	March 1997	0-671-00150-7
13	The Black Shore	Greg Cox	May 1997	0-671-56061-1
14	Marooned	Christie Golden	December 1997	0-671-01423-4
15	Echoes	Dean Wesley Smith, Kristine Kathryn Rusch and Nina Kiriki Hoffman	January 1998	0-671-00200-7
16	Seven of Nine	Christie Golden	September 1998	0-671-02491-4
17	Death of a Neutron Star	Eric Kotani and Dean Wesley Smith	March 1999	0-671-00425-5
18	Battle Lines	Dave Galanter and Greg Brodeur	May 1999	0-671-00259-7
19	Cloak and Dagger (Dark Matters, Book 1)	Christie Golden	November 2000	0-671-03582-7
20	Ghost Dance (Dark Matters, Book 2)	Christie Golden	November 2000	0-671-03583-5
21	Shadow of Heaven (Dark Matters, Book 3)	Christie Golden	December 2000	0-671-03584-3

==== Original novels (1996–2002) ====
Includes hardcover and paperback releases set within the continuity of the Voyager television series:

Title	Author(s)	Date	ISBN
Mosaic †	Jeri Taylor	October 1996	0-671-56311-4
Pathways †	Jeri Taylor	August 1998	0-671-00346-1
The Nanotech War	Steven Piziks	October 29, 2002	0-7434-3646-6

==== Starfleet Academy (1997) ====
Star Trek: Voyager – Starfleet Academy young adult miniseries explores the lives of the Voyager crew as Starfleet Academy cadets.

No.	Title ^	Author(s)	Date	ISBN
1	Lifeline	Bobbi J.G. Weiss and David Cody Weiss	August 1997	0-671-00845-5
2	The Chance Factor	Diana G. Gallagher and Martin R. Burke	September 1997	0-671-00732-7
3	Quarantine	Patricia Barnes-Svarney	October 1997	0-671-00733-5

==== Relaunch novels (2003–2020) ====
Interlinked novels set after the episode "Endgame". The series was reset with the publication of Kirsten Beyer's Full Circle (2009), connecting Voyager to the shared continuity of other relaunch book lines.

Title	Author(s)	Date	ISBN
Homecoming	Christie Golden	June 3, 2003	0-7434-6754-X
The Farther Shore	Christie Golden	July 1, 2003	0-7434-6755-8
Full Circle	Kirsten Beyer	March 31, 2009	978-1-4165-9496-3
Unworthy	Kirsten Beyer	September 29, 2009	978-1-4391-0398-2
Children of the Storm	Kirsten Beyer	May 31, 2011	978-1-4516-0718-5
The Eternal Tide	Kirsten Beyer	August 28, 2012	978-1-4516-6818-6
Protectors	Kirsten Beyer	January 28, 2014	978-1-4767-3854-3
Acts of Contrition	Kirsten Beyer	September 30, 2014	978-1-4767-6551-8
Atonement	Kirsten Beyer	August 25, 2015	978-1-4767-9081-7
A Pocket Full of Lies	Kirsten Beyer	January 26, 2016	978-1-4767-9084-8
Architects of Infinity	Kirsten Beyer	March 27, 2018	978-1-5011-3876-8
To Lose the Earth	Kirsten Beyer	October 13, 2020	978-1-5011-3883-6

==== Spirit Walk (2004) ====
Star Trek: Voyager – Spirit Walk miniseries follows Chakotay's first mission as captain of Voyager.

No.	Title	Author	Date	ISBN
1	Old Wounds	Christie Golden	October 26, 2004	0-7434-9258-7
2	Enemy of My Enemy	Christie Golden	November 30, 2004	0-7434-9257-9

==== String Theory (2005–06) ====
Star Trek: Voyager – String Theory was published on the tenth-anniversary of the pilot episode, "Caretaker". The first novel opens on a violent encounter with the Nacene, the extra-galactic race encountered in the episodes "Caretaker" and "Cold Fire". The novels included explanations for visual and narrative inconsistencies which developed during the television series run, as well as conclusions to unresolved plots.

No.	Title	Author(s)	Date	ISBN
1	Cohesion	Jeffrey Lang	June 28, 2005	0-7434-5718-8
2	Fusion	Kirsten Beyer	November 1, 2005	1-4165-0955-0
3	Evolution	Heather Jarman	February 28, 2006	1-4165-0781-7

=== Star Trek Log reprints (1995) ===
Star Trek Log reprints of the novelizations based on The Animated Series originally published by Ballantine Books. The printings include corrections to the text.

Title	Author	Released	ISBN
Star Trek Logs One – Three	Alan Dean Foster	April 1995	0-671-85403-8
Star Trek Logs Four – Six	Alan Dean Foster	May 1995	0-671-85404-6
Star Trek Logs Seven – Ten	Alan Dean Foster	June 1995	0-671-85405-4

=== Shatner and Reeves-Stevens series (1995–2007) ===
The series explores James Kirk's life after the events of Generations (1994). Created by William Shatner, the novels were co-written by Judith and Garfield Reeves-Stevens, who were not credited until Captain's Peril (2002). The Star Trek: Academy novel Collision Course (2007) ties into The Ashes of Eden (1995). The series was never given a name or brand. The fannish name, or nickname, for the series is the "Shatnerverse" which was adopted by Memory Alpha and ISFDB. Fans have grouped the novels into three unofficial trilogies: "Odyssey", "Mirror Universe", and "Totality". Continuity within the series is independent of other Star Trek book lines.

Title †	Author(s)	Date	ISBN	Unofficial trilogy title
The Ashes of Eden ‡	William Shatner	June 1995	0-671-52035-0	"Odyssey"
The Return ‡	William Shatner	April 1996	0-671-52610-3	"Odyssey"
Avenger ‡	William Shatner	May 1997	0-671-55132-9	"Odyssey"
Spectre	William Shatner	May 1998	0-671-00878-1	"Mirror Universe"
Dark Victory	William Shatner	April 1999	0-671-00882-X	"Mirror Universe"
Preserver	William Shatner	July 2000	0-671-02125-7	"Mirror Universe"
Captain's Peril	William Shatner, with Judith and Garfield Reeves-Stevens	October 8, 2002	0-7434-4819-7	"Totality"
Captain's Blood	William Shatner, with Judith and Garfield Reeves-Stevens	December 9, 2003	0-671-02129-X	"Totality"
Captain's Glory	William Shatner, with Judith and Garfield Reeves-Stevens	August 22, 2006	0-7434-5343-3	"Totality"

=== Invasion! (1996) ===
Star Trek: Invasion! crossover miniseries spanned each of the Star Trek television series broadcast prior to 1996. An omnibus edition was published in 1998 which included additional material. The series was created and edited by John J. Ordover.

No.	Title	Author(s)	Date	ISBN
1	First Strike (Star Trek, Book 79)	Diane Carey	July 1996	0-671-54002-5
2	The Soldiers of Fear (The Next Generation, Book 41)	Dean Wesley Smith and Kristine Kathryn Rusch	July 1996	0-671-54174-9
3	Time's Enemy (Deep Space Nine, Book 16)	L. A. Graf	August 1996	0-671-54150-1
4	The Final Fury (Voyager, Book 9)	Dafydd ab Hugh	August 1996	0-671-54181-1

=== New Frontier (1997–2015) ===
Star Trek: New Frontier was the first book line not to be based on a Star Trek television series or film. The novels follow the crew of the Excalibur (NCC-26517) under the command of Mackenzie Calhoun. Created by John J. Ordover.

==== Numbered novels (1997–2001) ====
Numbered paperback and hardcover releases. Not all printings include a number stamp.

No.	Title	Author	Date	ISBN
1	House of Cards ‡	Peter David	July 1997	0-671-01395-5
2	Into the Void ‡	Peter David	July 1997	0-671-01396-3
3	The Two-Front War ‡	Peter David	August 1997	0-671-01397-1
4	End Game ‡	Peter David	August 1997	0-671-01398-X
5	Martyr	Peter David	March 1998	0-671-02036-6
6	Fire on High	Peter David	April 1998	0-671-02037-4
7	The Quiet Place	Peter David	November 1999	0-671-02079-X
8	Dark Allies	Peter David	November 1999	0-671-02080-3
9	Requiem (Excalibur, Book 1)	Peter David	September 2000	0-671-04238-6
10	Renaissance (Excalibur, Book 2)	Peter David	September 2000	0-671-04239-4
11	Restoration † (Excalibur, Book 3)	Peter David	November 2000	0-671-04243-2
12	Being Human	Peter David	October 30, 2001	0-671-04240-8

==== Original novels (2003–2015) ====
Includes paperback and ebook exclusives which continue the continuity established by the numbered series:

Title	Author	Date	ISBN
Gods Above	Peter David	September 30, 2003	0-7434-1858-1
Stone and Anvil †	Peter David	October 28, 2003	0-7434-2957-5
After the Fall †	Peter David	November 30, 2004	0-7434-9184-X
Missing in Action †	Peter David	February 28, 2006	1-4165-1080-X
Treason	Peter David	April 14, 2009	978-0-7434-2961-0
Blind Man's Bluff	Peter David	April 26, 2011	978-0-7434-2960-3
The Returned, Part One ◊	Peter David	July 6, 2015	978-1-4767-9092-3
The Returned, Part Two ◊	Peter David	August 3, 2015	978-1-4767-9093-0
The Returned, Part Three ◊	Peter David	September 7, 2015	978-1-4767-9095-4

=== Day of Honor (1997) ===
Star Trek: Day of Honor crossover miniseries is inspired by the Voyager episode "Day of Honor". Created by Paula M. Block and John J. Ordover. Honor Bound (1997), a Corps of Engineers novella by Diana G. Gallagher, and Michael Jan Friedman's novelization of the titular episode, tie into the series. An omnibus edition including all six works was published in 1999.

No.	Title	Author(s)	Date	ISBN
1	Ancient Blood (The Next Generation)	Diane Carey	September 1997	0-671-00238-4
2	Armageddon Sky (Deep Space Nine)	L. A. Graf	September 1997	0-671-00675-4
3	Her Klingon Soul (Voyager)	Michael Jan Friedman	October 1997	0-671-00240-6
4	Treaty's Law	Kristine Kathryn Rusch and Dean Wesley Smith	October 1997	0-671-00424-7

=== Captain's Table (1998) ===
Star Trek: The Captain's Table crossover miniseries is narrated by various starship captains during their visits to a trans-dimensional bar called The Captain's Table. An omnibus edition was published in 2000. Tales from the Captain's Table (2005), a short story collection edited by Keith DeCandido, ties into the series. The cover art by Keith Birdsong was intended to form a polyptych; however, design and printing errors resulted in the six images not aligning. Reprints have included new cover art.

No.	Title	Author(s)	Date	ISBN
1	War Dragons	L. A. Graf (Note: War Dragons (1998), as by James T. Kirk and Hikaru Sulu, told in their own words, as recorded by L.A. Graf.)	June 1998	0-671-01463-3
2	Dujonian's Hoard (The Next Generation)	Michael Jan Friedman (Note: Dujonian's Hoard (1998), as by Jean Luc Picard, told in his own words, as recorded by Michael Jan Friedman.)	June 1998	0-671-01465-X
3	The Mist (Deep Space Nine)	Dean Wesley Smith and Kristine Kathryn Rusch (Note: The Mist (1998), as by Benjamin Sisko, told in his own words, as recorded by Dean Wesley Smith and Kristine Kathryn Rusch.)	July 1998	0-671-01471-4
4	Fire Ship (Voyager)	Diane Carey (Note: Fire Ship (1998), as by Kathryn Janeway, told in her own words, as recorded by Diane Carey.)	July 1998	0-671-01467-6
5	Once Burned (New Frontier)	Peter David (Note: Once Burned (1998) as by Mackenzie Calhoun, in his own words, as recorded by Peter David.)	October 1998	0-671-02078-1
6	Where Sea Meets Sky	Jerry Oltion (Note: Where Sea Meets Sky (1998), as by Christopher Pike, told in his own words, as recorded by Jerry Oltion.)	October 1998	0-671-02400-0

=== Strange New Worlds (1998–2016) ===
Star Trek: Strange New Worlds is a series of short story collections edited by Dean Wesley Smith. Each volume collected fan-submitted stories similar to the New Voyages (1976–1977) originally published by Bantam. The book line based on the Strange New Worlds television series is unrelated.

Title	Author(s)	Date	ISBN
Strange New Worlds	Dean Wesley Smith, ed.	July 1998	0-671-01446-3
Strange New Worlds II	Dean Wesley Smith, ed.	May 1999	0-671-02692-5
Strange New Worlds III	Dean Wesley Smith, ed.	May 2000	0-671-03652-1
Strange New Worlds IV	Dean Wesley Smith, ed.	May 1, 2001	0-7434-1131-5
Strange New Worlds V	Dean Wesley Smith, ed.	May 28, 2002	0-7434-3778-0
Strange New Worlds VI	Dean Wesley Smith, ed.	June 17, 2003	0-7434-6753-1
Strange New Worlds VII	Dean Wesley Smith, ed.	June 29, 2004	0-7434-8780-X
Strange New Worlds 8	Dean Wesley Smith, ed.	July 19, 2005	1-4165-0345-5
Strange New Worlds 9	Dean Wesley Smith, ed.	August 22, 2006	1-4165-2048-1
Strange New Worlds 10	Dean Wesley Smith, ed.	July 10, 2007	978-1-4165-4438-8
Strange New Worlds 2016 ◊	Various (Note: Strange New Worlds 2016 (2016) by Neil Bryant, Gary Piserchio and Frank Tagader, Kelli Fitzpatrick, Chris Chaplin, Michael Turner, Nancy Debretsion, Derek Tyler Attico, Roger McCoy, John Coffren, and Kristen McQuinn.)	October 3, 2016	978-1-5011-6158-2

=== Dominion War (1998) ===
Star Trek: The Dominion War crossover miniseries depicts events leading up to the Dominion War. The first and third novels focus on the crew of the Enterprise (NCC-1701-E), while the second and fourth novels are novelizations of a seven-episode arc from Deep Space Nine's sixth and seventh seasons. The Battle for Betazed (2002), by Charlotte Douglas and Susan Kearney, and Tales of the Dominion War (2004), a short story collection edited by Keith DeCandido, tie into the series.

No.	Title	Author(s)	Date	ISBN
1	Behind Enemy Lines (The Next Generation)	John Vornholt	November 1998	0-671-02499-X
2	Call to Arms (Deep Space Nine)	Diane Carey	November 1998	0-671-02497-3
3	Tunnel Through the Stars (The Next Generation)	John Vornholt	December 1998	0-671-02500-7
4	Sacrifice of Angels (Deep Space Nine)	Diane Carey	December 1998	0-671-02498-1

=== Corps of Engineers (2000–2010) ===
Star Trek: Corps of Engineers follows the crew of the Da Vinci (NCC-81623), featuring Montgomery Scott following events in The Next Generation episode "Relics". The series was marketed as ebook exclusives on various platforms, which were later collected into print bind-ups with similar titles with a different volume number. The series was originally published as Star Trek: Starfleet Corps of Engineers, abbreviated as S.C.E.

Each omnibus is a bind-up of multiple novellas in mass market paperback format. After 2005, volumes were published in trade paperback format and included the updated Corps of Engineers marquee. Out of the Cocoon (2010) and What's Past (2010) did not receive ebook releases.

==== Original novellas (2000–2006) ====
All novellas were later collected in bind-ups, or omnibus editions:

No.	Title ◊‡	Author(s)	Date	ISBN (ebook)
1	The Belly of the Beast	Dean Wesley Smith	August 8, 2000	0-7434-1901-4
2	Fatal Error	Keith DeCandido	September 13, 2000	0-7434-1902-2
3	Hard Crash	Christie Golden	October 8, 2000	0-7434-1903-0
4	Interphase, Part One	Dayton Ward and Kevin Dilmore	February 28, 2001	0-7434-2882-X
5	Interphase, Part Two	Dayton Ward and Kevin Dilmore	March 28, 2001	0-7434-2871-4
6	Cold Fusion	Keith DeCandido	July 27, 2001	0-7434-2875-7
7	Invincible, Part One	Keith DeCandido and David Mack	August 15, 2001	0-7434-2872-2
8	Invincible, Part Two	Keith DeCandido and David Mack	September 26, 2001	0-7434-2873-0
9	The Riddled Post	Aaron Rosenberg	October 12, 2001	0-7434-2876-5
10	Here There Be Monsters (Gateways)	Keith DeCandido	November 15, 2001	0-7434-2877-3
11	Ambush	Dave Galanter	December 14, 2001	0-7434-2878-1
12	Some Assembly Required	Scott Ciencin and Dan Jolley	January 15, 2002	0-7434-2879-X
13	No Surrender	Jeff Mariotte	February 11, 2002	0-7434-2880-3
14	Caveat Emptor	Ian Edginton and Mike Collins	March 15, 2002	0-7434-2874-9
15	Past Life	Robert Greenberger	April 15, 2002	0-7434-2881-1
16	Oaths	Glenn Hauman	May 15, 2002	0-7434-5671-8
17	Foundations, Part One	Kevin Dilmore and Dayton Ward	June 14, 2002	0-7434-5672-6
18	Foundations, Part Two	Kevin Dilmore and Dayton Ward	July 15, 2002	0-7434-5673-4
19	Foundations, Part Three	Kevin Dilmore and Dayton Ward	August 15, 2002	0-7434-5674-2
20	Enigma Ship	J. Steven York and Christina F. York	September 23, 2002	0-7434-5675-0
21	War Stories, Book One	Keith DeCandido	October 30, 2002	0-7434-5676-9
22	War Stories, Book Two	Keith DeCandido	November 15, 2002	0-7434-5677-7
23	Wildfire, Book One	David Mack	January 2, 2003	0-7434-5678-5
24	Wildfire, Book Two	David Mack	January 23, 2003	0-7434-5679-3
25	Home Fires	Dayton Ward and Kevin Dilmore	February 14, 2003	0-7434-7591-7
26	Age of Unreason	Scott Ciencin	March 18, 2003	0-7434-7592-5
27	Balance of Nature	Heather Jarman	April 3, 2003	0-7434-7593-3
28	Breakdowns	Keith DeCandido	June 17, 2003	0-7434-7456-2
29	Aftermath	Christopher L. Bennett	July 15, 2003	0-7434-7058-3
30	Ishtar Rising, Book One	Michael A. Martin and Andy Mangels	July 28, 2003	0-7434-7605-0
31	Ishtar Rising, Book Two	Michael A. Martin and Andy Mangels	August 20, 2003	0-7434-7606-9
32	Buying Time	Robert Greenberger	September 30, 2003	0-7434-7608-5
33	Collective Hindsight, Book One	Aaron Rosenberg	October 27, 2003	0-7434-8083-X
34	Collective Hindsight, Book Two	Aaron Rosenberg	November 17, 2003	0-7434-8084-8
35	The Demon, Book One	Loren L. Coleman and Randall L. Bills	December 15, 2003	0-7434-7609-3
36	The Demon, Book Two	Loren L. Coleman and Randall L. Bills	January 1, 2004	0-7434-7610-7
37	Ring Around the Sky	Allyn Gibson	March 29, 2004	0-7434-7611-5
38	Orphans	Kevin Killiany	April 21, 2004	0-7434-8085-6
39	Grand Designs	Dayton Ward and Kevin Dilmore	May 3, 2004	0-7434-8086-4
40	Failsafe	David Mack	May 21, 2004	0-7434-8087-2
41	Bitter Medicine	Dave Galanter	June 15, 2004	0-7434-9685-X
42	Sargasso Sector	Paul Kupperberg	July 26, 2004	0-7434-9367-2
43	Paradise Interrupted	John S. Drew	August 17, 2004	0-7434-9366-4
44	Where Time Stands Still	Dayton Ward and Kevin Dilmore	September 1, 2004	0-7434-9361-3
45	The Art of the Deal	Glenn Greenberg	October 25, 2004	0-7434-9686-8
46	Spin	J. Steven York and Christina F. York	November 15, 2004	0-7434-9687-6
47	Creative Couplings, Book One	Glenn Hauman and Aaron Rosenberg	December 15, 2004	0-7434-9688-4
48	Creative Couplings, Book Two	Glenn Hauman and Aaron Rosenberg	February 1, 2005	0-7434-9689-2
49	Small World	David Mack	March 1, 2005	0-7434-9690-6
50	Malefictorum	Terri Osborne	March 25, 2005	0-7434-9691-4
51	Lost Time	Ilsa J. Bick	April 22, 2005	1-4165-0690-X
52	Identity Crisis	John J. Ordover	May 6, 2005	0-7434-9684-1
53	Fables of the Prime Directive	Cory Rushton	June 15, 2005	0-7434-9683-3
54	Security	Keith DeCandido	August 1, 2005	1-4165-1091-5
55	Wounds, Book One	Ilsa J. Bick	August 1, 2005	1-4165-0960-7
56	Wounds, Book Two	Ilsa J. Bick	October 1, 2005	1-4165-0961-5
57	Out of the Cocoon	William Leisner	October 1, 2005	0-7434-9692-2
58	Honor	Kevin Killiany	December 15, 2005	1-4165-1059-1
59	Blackout	Phaedra M. Weldon	December 23, 2005	1-4165-2043-0
60	The Cleanup	Robert T. Jeschonek	January 20, 2006	1-4165-2044-9
61	Progress (What's Past, Book 1)	Terri Osborne	February 17, 2006	1-4165-2045-7
62	The Future Begins (What's Past, Book 2)	Steve Mollmann and Michael Schuster	April 1, 2006	1-4165-2046-5
63	Echoes of Coventry (What's Past, Book 3)	Richard C. White	May 15, 2006	1-4165-2047-3
64	Distant Early Warning (What's Past, Book 4)	Dayton Ward and Kevin Dilmore	June 1, 2006	1-4165-3309-5
65	10 Is Better Than 01 (What's Past, Book 5)	Heather Jarman	September 1, 2006	1-4165-3308-7
66	Many Splendors (What's Past, Book 6)	Keith DeCandido	September 1, 2006	1-4165-3307-9

==== Novella bind-ups (2002–2010) ====
Each bind-up volume collects three and five novellas in mass market paperback format. After 2005, volumes were published in trade paperback format and included the updated Corps of Engineers marquee. The final volumes, Out of the Cocoon (2010) and What's Past (2010), did not receive concurrent ebook releases.

Vol.	Bind-up	Collected novellas	Author(s)	Date	ISBN (print)	ISBN (ebook)
1	Have Tech, Will Travel	The Belly of the Beast	Dean Wesley Smith	January 1, 2002	0-7434-3996-1	0-7434-3997-X
1	Have Tech, Will Travel	Fatal Error	Keith DeCandido	January 1, 2002	0-7434-3996-1	0-7434-3997-X
1	Have Tech, Will Travel	Hard Crash	Christie Golden	January 1, 2002	0-7434-3996-1	0-7434-3997-X
1	Have Tech, Will Travel	Interphase, Part One	Dayton Ward and Kevin Dilmore	January 1, 2002	0-7434-3996-1	0-7434-3997-X
2	Miracle Workers	Interphase, Part Two	Dayton Ward and Kevin Dilmore	January 29, 2002	0-7434-4412-4	0-7434-4847-2
2	Miracle Workers	Cold Fusion	Keith DeCandido	January 29, 2002	0-7434-4412-4	0-7434-4847-2
2	Miracle Workers	Invincible, Part One	Keith DeCandido and David Mack	January 29, 2002	0-7434-4412-4	0-7434-4847-2
2	Miracle Workers	Invincible, Part Two	Keith DeCandido and David Mack	January 29, 2002	0-7434-4412-4	0-7434-4847-2
3	Some Assembly Required	The Riddled Post	Aaron Rosenberg	April 3, 2003	0-7434-6442-7	0-7434-6703-5
3	Some Assembly Required	Here There Be Monsters (Gateways)	Keith DeCandido	April 3, 2003	0-7434-6442-7	0-7434-6703-5
3	Some Assembly Required	Ambush	Dave Galanter	April 3, 2003	0-7434-6442-7	0-7434-6703-5
3	Some Assembly Required	Some Assembly Required	Scott Ciencin and Dan Jolley	April 3, 2003	0-7434-6442-7	0-7434-6703-5
4	No Surrender	No Surrender	Jeff Mariotte	April 29, 2003	0-7434-6443-5	0-7434-6705-1
4	No Surrender	Caveat Emptor	Ian Edginton and Mike Collins	April 29, 2003	0-7434-6443-5	0-7434-6705-1
4	No Surrender	Past Life	Robert Greenberger	April 29, 2003	0-7434-6443-5	0-7434-6705-1
4	No Surrender	Oaths	Glenn Hauman	April 29, 2003	0-7434-6443-5	0-7434-6705-1
5	Foundations	Foundations, Part One	Kevin Dilmore and Dayton Ward	February 24, 2004	0-7434-8300-6	0-7434-8905-5
5	Foundations	Foundations, Part Two	Kevin Dilmore and Dayton Ward	February 24, 2004	0-7434-8300-6	0-7434-8905-5
5	Foundations	Foundations, Part Three	Kevin Dilmore and Dayton Ward	February 24, 2004	0-7434-8300-6	0-7434-8905-5
6	Wildfire	Enigma Ship	J. Steven York and Christina F. York	October 26, 2004	0-7434-9661-2	1-4165-0788-4
6	Wildfire	War Stories, Book One	Keith DeCandido	October 26, 2004	0-7434-9661-2	1-4165-0788-4
6	Wildfire	War Stories, Book Two	Keith DeCandido	October 26, 2004	0-7434-9661-2	1-4165-0788-4
6	Wildfire	Wildfire, Book One	David Mack	October 26, 2004	0-7434-9661-2	1-4165-0788-4
6	Wildfire	Wildfire, Book Two	David Mack	October 26, 2004	0-7434-9661-2	1-4165-0788-4
7	Breakdowns	Home Fires	Dayton Ward and Kevin Dilmore	April 26, 2005	1-4165-0326-9	1-4165-1727-8
7	Breakdowns	Age of Unreason	Scott Ciencin	April 26, 2005	1-4165-0326-9	1-4165-1727-8
7	Breakdowns	Balance of Nature	Heather Jarman	April 26, 2005	1-4165-0326-9	1-4165-1727-8
7	Breakdowns	Breakdowns	Keith DeCandido	April 26, 2005	1-4165-0326-9	1-4165-1727-8
8	Aftermath	Aftermath	Christopher L. Bennett	November 21, 2006	1-4165-2576-9	1-4165-4992-7
8	Aftermath	Ishtar Rising, Book One	Michael A. Martin and Andy Mangels	November 21, 2006	1-4165-2576-9	1-4165-4992-7
8	Aftermath	Ishtar Rising, Book Two	Michael A. Martin and Andy Mangels	November 21, 2006	1-4165-2576-9	1-4165-4992-7
8	Aftermath	Buying Time	Robert Greenberger	November 21, 2006	1-4165-2576-9	1-4165-4992-7
8	Aftermath	Collective Hindsight, Book One	Aaron Rosenberg	November 21, 2006	1-4165-2576-9	1-4165-4992-7
8	Aftermath	Collective Hindsight, Book Two	Aaron Rosenberg	November 21, 2006	1-4165-2576-9	1-4165-4992-7
8	Aftermath	The Demon, Book One	Loren L. Coleman and Randall L. Bills	November 21, 2006	1-4165-2576-9	1-4165-4992-7
8	Aftermath	The Demon, Book Two	Loren L. Coleman and Randall L. Bills	November 21, 2006	1-4165-2576-9	1-4165-4992-7
9	Grand Designs	Ring Around the Sky	Allyn Gibson	July 3, 2007	978-1-4165-4489-0	978-1-4165-7916-8
9	Grand Designs	Orphans	Kevin Killiany	July 3, 2007	978-1-4165-4489-0	978-1-4165-7916-8
9	Grand Designs	Grand Designs	Dayton Ward and Kevin Dilmore	July 3, 2007	978-1-4165-4489-0	978-1-4165-7916-8
9	Grand Designs	Failsafe	David Mack	July 3, 2007	978-1-4165-4489-0	978-1-4165-7916-8
9	Grand Designs	Bitter Medicine	Dave Galanter	July 3, 2007	978-1-4165-4489-0	978-1-4165-7916-8
9	Grand Designs	Sargasso Sector	Paul Kupperberg	July 3, 2007	978-1-4165-4489-0	978-1-4165-7916-8
10	Creative Couplings	Paradise Interrupted	John S. Drew	December 11, 2007	978-1-4165-4898-0	978-1-4165-5474-5
10	Creative Couplings	Where Time Stands Still	Dayton Ward and Kevin Dilmore	December 11, 2007	978-1-4165-4898-0	978-1-4165-5474-5
10	Creative Couplings	The Art of the Deal	Glenn Greenberg	December 11, 2007	978-1-4165-4898-0	978-1-4165-5474-5
10	Creative Couplings	Spin	J. Steven York and Christina F. York	December 11, 2007	978-1-4165-4898-0	978-1-4165-5474-5
10	Creative Couplings	Creative Couplings, Book One	Glenn Hauman and Aaron Rosenberg	December 11, 2007	978-1-4165-4898-0	978-1-4165-5474-5
10	Creative Couplings	Creative Couplings, Book Two	Glenn Hauman and Aaron Rosenberg	December 11, 2007	978-1-4165-4898-0	978-1-4165-5474-5
10	Creative Couplings	Small World	David Mack	December 11, 2007	978-1-4165-4898-0	978-1-4165-5474-5
11	Wounds	Malefictorum	Terri Osborne	October 21, 2008	978-1-4165-8909-9	978-1-4391-1794-1
11	Wounds	Lost Time	Ilsa J. Bick	October 21, 2008	978-1-4165-8909-9	978-1-4391-1794-1
11	Wounds	Identity Crisis	John J. Ordover	October 21, 2008	978-1-4165-8909-9	978-1-4391-1794-1
11	Wounds	Fables of the Prime Directive	Cory Rushton	October 21, 2008	978-1-4165-8909-9	978-1-4391-1794-1
11	Wounds	Security	Keith DeCandido	October 21, 2008	978-1-4165-8909-9	978-1-4391-1794-1
11	Wounds	Wounds, Book One	Ilsa J. Bick	October 21, 2008	978-1-4165-8909-9	978-1-4391-1794-1
11	Wounds	Wounds, Book Two	Ilsa J. Bick	October 21, 2008	978-1-4165-8909-9	978-1-4391-1794-1
12	Out of the Cocoon	Out of the Cocoon	William Leisner	July 20, 2010	978-1-4391-4842-6	—
12	Out of the Cocoon	Honor	Kevin Killiany	July 20, 2010	978-1-4391-4842-6	—
12	Out of the Cocoon	Blackout	Phaedra M. Weldon	July 20, 2010	978-1-4391-4842-6	—
12	Out of the Cocoon	The Cleanup	Robert T. Jeschonek	July 20, 2010	978-1-4391-4842-6	—
13	What's Past	Progress	Terri Osborne	August 24, 2010	978-1-4391-9486-7	—
13	What's Past	The Future Begins	Steve Mollmann and Michael Schuster	August 24, 2010	978-1-4391-9486-7	—
13	What's Past	Echoes of Coventry	Richard C. White	August 24, 2010	978-1-4391-9486-7	—
13	What's Past	Distant Early Warning	Dayton Ward and Kevin Dilmore	August 24, 2010	978-1-4391-9486-7	—
13	What's Past	10 Is Better Than 01	Heather Jarman	August 24, 2010	978-1-4391-9486-7	—
13	What's Past	Many Splendors	Keith DeCandido	August 24, 2010	978-1-4391-9486-7	—

==== Relaunch novellas (2006–07) ====
Relaunch of the novella series as Corps of Engineers. Published as ebook exclusives. The novellas have not been collected in any print editions.

Title ◊	Author(s)	Date	ISBN (ebook)
Turn the Page	Dayton Ward and Kevin Dilmore	December 26, 2006	1-4165-4324-4
Troubleshooting	Robert Greenberger	December 26, 2006	1-4165-3306-0
The Light	Jeff D. Jacques	January 2, 2007	978-1-4165-4566-8
The Art of the Comeback	Glenn Greenberg	May 1, 2007	978-1-4165-4978-9
Signs from Heaven	Phaedra M. Weldon	May 29, 2007	978-1-4165-4979-6
Ghost	Ilsa J. Bick	July 10, 2007	978-1-4165-4975-8
Remembrance of Things Past, Book One	Terri Osborne	September 18, 2007	978-1-4165-4407-4
Remembrance of Things Past, Book Two	Terri Osborne	October 30, 2007	978-1-4165-4409-8

=== Section 31 (2001) ===
Star Trek: Section 31 crossover miniseries was inspired by the clandestine, paramilitary organization introduced in the Deep Space Nine episode "Inquisition". The series was relaunched in 2014.

No.	Title	Author(s)	Date	ISBN
1	Rogue (The Next Generation)	Andy Mangels and Michael A. Martin	May 22, 2001	0-671-77477-8
2	Shadow (Voyager)	Dean Wesley Smith and Kristine Kathryn Rusch	May 22, 2001	0-671-77478-6
3	Cloak	S. D. Perry	June 26, 2001	0-671-77471-9
4	Abyss ‡ (Deep Space Nine)	David Weddle and Jeffrey Lang	June 26, 2001	0-671-77483-2

=== Gateways (2001) ===
Star Trek: Gateways crossover miniseries explores various Starfleet crews' interactions with trans-dimensional "gates" left behind by the extinct Iconian civilization. The series was created by Robert Greenberger and John J. Ordover. An omnibus edition was announced in 2001, but was never published. Here There Be Monsters (2001), a Corps of Engineers novella by Keith DeCandido, serves as an epilogue to the series.

No.	Title	Author(s)	Date	ISBN
1	One Small Step	Susan Wright	July 31, 2001	0-7434-1854-9
2	Chainmail (Challenger)	Diane Carey	July 31, 2001	0-7434-1855-7
3	Doors into Chaos (The Next Generation)	Robert Greenberger	August 28, 2001	0-7434-1856-5
4	Demons of Air and Darkness ‡ (Deep Space Nine)	Keith DeCandido	August 28, 2001	0-7434-1852-2
5	No Man's Land (Note: Similarly named novels: No Man's Land (2001), a Voyager novel by Christie Golden; No Man's Land, a Picard novel and original audiodrama adaptation by Kirsten Beyer and Mike Johnson.) (Voyager)	Christie Golden	October 2, 2001	0-7434-1857-3
6	Cold Wars (New Frontier)	Peter David	October 2, 2001	0-671-04242-4
7	What Lay Beyond † (collection)	John J. Ordover, ed. (Note: What Lay Beyond (2001) by John J. Ordover, editor, with Diane Carey, Peter David, Keith DeCandido, Christie Golden, Robert Greenberger, and Susan Wright.)	October 30, 2001	0-7434-3112-X

=== Challenger (2001) ===
Star Trek: Challenger is a flagship concept series featuring the UFPF Challenger (OV91951L). The crew was introduced in the New Earth (2000) miniseries. Only one novel was published.

Title	Author	Date	ISBN
Chainmail (Gateways, Book 2)	Diane Carey	July 31, 2001	0-7434-1855-7

=== Enterprise (2001–2017) ===

Star Trek: Enterprise book line is based on the television series of the same name. Originally published as Enterprise, without the Star Trek prefix. The book line was relaunched with the publication of Last Full Measure (2006), by Andy Mangels and Michael A. Martin.

==== Episode novelizations (2001–2003) ====
Based on select episodes from the television series:

Title	Author(s)	Date	ISBN
Broken Bow †	Diane Carey	October 2, 2001	0-7434-4862-6
Shockwave †	Paul Ruditis	October 15, 2002	0-7434-6455-9
The Expanse	J. M. Dillard	September 30, 2003	0-7434-8485-1

==== Original novels (2002–2006) ====
Includes hardcover and paperback releases set within the continuity of the Enterprise television series. Daedalus (2003) and Daedalus's Children (2004) form a two-part novel that explores the aftermath of a prototype warp ship's disastrous launch thirteen years prior to the launch of the Enterprise (NX-01).

Title	Author(s)	Date	ISBN
By the Book	Dean Wesley Smith and Kristine Kathryn Rusch	January 2, 2002	0-7434-4871-5
What Price Honor?	Dave Stern	October 29, 2002	0-7434-6278-5
Surak's Soul	J. M. Dillard	February 25, 2003	0-7434-6280-7
Daedalus	Dave Stern	November 25, 2003	0-7434-7118-0
Daedalus's Children	Dave Stern	April 27, 2004	0-7434-7646-8
Rosetta	Dave Stern	January 31, 2006	1-4165-0956-9

==== Relaunch novels (2006–2008) ====
Interlinked novels set after the episode "These Are the Voyages...":

Title	Author(s)	Date	ISBN
Last Full Measure	Andy Mangels and Michael A. Martin	April 25, 2006	1-4165-0358-7
The Good That Men Do	Andy Mangels and Michael A. Martin	February 27, 2007	978-0-7434-4001-1
Kobayashi Maru	Andy Mangels and Michael A. Martin	August 26, 2008	978-1-4165-5480-6

==== Romulan War (2009–2011) ====
Star Trek: Enterprise – Romulan War explores the events of the Earth–Romulan War from the perspective of the Enterprise crew.

Title	Author	Date	ISBN
Beneath the Raptor's Wing	Michael A. Martin	October 20, 2009	978-1-4391-0798-0
To Brave the Storm	Michael A. Martin	October 25, 2011	978-1-4516-0715-4

==== Rise of the Federation (2013–2017) ====
Star Trek: Enterprise – Rise of the Federation explores the creation of the United Federation of Planets, and the rise of Jonathan Archer to President of the Federation.

Title	Author	Date	ISBN
A Choice of Futures	Christopher L. Bennett	June 25, 2013	978-1-4767-0674-0
Tower of Babel	Christopher L. Bennett	March 25, 2014	978-1-4767-4964-8
Uncertain Logic	Christopher L. Bennett	March 24, 2015	978-1-4767-7911-9
Live by the Code	Christopher L. Bennett	March 29, 2016	978-1-4767-7913-3
Patterns of Interference	Christopher L. Bennett	August 29, 2017	978-1-5011-6570-2

=== Stargazer (2002–2004) ===
Star Trek: Stargazer follows Jean-Luc Picard in command of the Stargazer (NCC-2893) prior to his promotion to captain of the Enterprise. Reunion (1991) and The Valiant (2000), also by Friedman, tie into the series.

No.	Title	Author	Date	ISBN
1	Gauntlet	Michael Jan Friedman	April 30, 2002	0-7434-2792-0
2	Progenitor	Michael Jan Friedman	April 30, 2002	0-7434-2794-7
3	Three	Michael Jan Friedman	July 29, 2003	0-7434-4852-9
4	Oblivion	Michael Jan Friedman	August 26, 2003	0-7434-4854-5
5	Enigma	Michael Jan Friedman	July 27, 2004	0-7434-4856-1
6	Maker	Michael Jan Friedman	August 31, 2004	0-7434-4858-8

=== The Lost Era (2003–2014) ===
Star Trek: The Lost Era explores events prior to The Next Generation episode "Encounter at Farpoint". The Buried Age (2007), by Christopher L. Bennett, and the Terok Nor (2008) series, were marketed as "Tales of the Lost Era". Not all printings include a number stamp.

No.	Title	Author(s)	Date	ISBN
1	The Sundered	Michael A. Martin and Andy Mangels	July 29, 2003	0-7434-6401-X
2	Serpents Among the Ruins	David R. George III	August 26, 2003	0-7434-6403-6
3	The Art of the Impossible	Keith DeCandido	September 30, 2003	0-7434-6405-2
4	Well of Souls	Ilsa J. Bick	October 28, 2003	0-7434-6375-7
5	Deny Thy Father	Jeff Mariotte	November 25, 2003	0-7434-6409-5
6	Catalyst of Sorrows	Margaret Wander Bonanno	December 30, 2003	0-7434-6407-9
7	One Constant Star	David R. George III	May 27, 2014	978-1-4767-5021-7

=== I.K.S. Gorkon (2003–2005) ===
Star Trek: I.K.S. Gorkon follows the exploits of a Klingon destroyer ordered into unexplored space to find new planets to conquer on behalf of the Klingon Empire. The series was relaunched as Klingon Empire in 2008.

No.	Title	Author	Date	ISBN
1	A Good Day to Die	Keith DeCandido	October 28, 2003	0-7434-5714-5
2	Honor Bound	Keith DeCandido	November 25, 2003	0-7434-5716-1
3	Enemy Territory	Keith DeCandido	March 1, 2005	1-4165-0014-6

=== Signature Edition (2003–04) ===
The Signature Edition series collects novels from the Star Trek and The Next Generation book lines. The omnibus editions include amplifying material such as author's notes, essays, and interviews.

Omnibus ≈	Collected novels	Author(s)	Date	ISBN
Pantheon	Reunion	Michael Jan Friedman	September 16, 2003	0-7434-8511-4
Pantheon	The Valiant	Michael Jan Friedman	September 16, 2003	0-7434-8511-4
The Q Continuum	Q-Space	Greg Cox	October 7, 2003	0-7434-8508-4
The Q Continuum	Q-Zone	Greg Cox	October 7, 2003	0-7434-8508-4
The Q Continuum	Q-Strike	Greg Cox	October 7, 2003	0-7434-8508-4
Worlds in Collision	Memory Prime	Judith and Garfield Reeves-Stevens	November 4, 2003	0-7434-8509-2
Worlds in Collision	Prime Directive	Judith and Garfield Reeves-Stevens	November 4, 2003	0-7434-8509-2
Imzadi Forever	Imzadi	Peter David	December 2, 2003	0-7434-8510-6
Imzadi Forever	Triangle: Imzadi II	Peter David	December 2, 2003	0-7434-8510-6
Duty, Honor, Redemption	Star Trek: The Wrath of Khan	Vonda N. McIntyre	October 26, 2004	0-7434-9660-4
Duty, Honor, Redemption	Star Trek III: The Search for Spock	Vonda N. McIntyre	October 26, 2004	0-7434-9660-4
Duty, Honor, Redemption	Star Trek IV: The Voyage Home	Vonda N. McIntyre	October 26, 2004	0-7434-9660-4
The Hand of Kahless	The Final Reflection	John M. Ford	November 16, 2004	0-7434-9659-0
The Hand of Kahless	Kahless	Michael Jan Friedman	November 16, 2004	0-7434-9659-0
Sand and Stars	Spock's World	Diane Duane	December 7, 2004	0-7434-9658-2
Sand and Stars	Sarek	A. C. Crispin	December 7, 2004	0-7434-9658-2

=== Titan (2005–2017) ===
Star Trek: Titan is a flagship series set aboard the Titan (NCC-80102), under the command of William Riker. The starship Titan was introduced in Nemesis (2002), and later appeared in several episodes of the TV series Lower Decks. Not all printings include a number stamp.

No.	Title	Author(s)	Date	ISBN
1	Taking Wing	Michael A. Martin and Andy Mangels	March 29, 2005	0-7434-9627-2
2	The Red King	Michael A. Martin and Andy Mangels	September 27, 2005	0-7434-9628-0
3	Orion's Hounds	Christopher L. Bennett	December 27, 2005	1-4165-0950-X
4	Sword of Damocles	Geoffrey Thorne	November 27, 2007	978-1-4165-2694-0
5	Over a Torrent Sea	Christopher L. Bennett	February 24, 2009	978-1-4165-9497-0
6	Synthesis	James Swallow	October 27, 2009	978-1-4391-0914-4
7	Fallen Gods	Michael A. Martin	July 31, 2012	978-1-4516-6062-3
8	Absent Enemies ◊	John Jackson Miller	February 24, 2014	978-1-4767-6299-9
9	Sight Unseen	James Swallow	September 29, 2015	978-1-4767-8316-1
10	Fortune of War	David Mack	November 28, 2017	978-1-5011-5200-9

=== Vanguard (2005–2012) ===
Star Trek: Vanguard is a flagship concept series concurrent with the events of The Original Series. The novels are set aboard Starfleet Starbase 47 positioned on the edge of the Taurus Reach known as Vanguard to its residents and crew. The series was created and written by Dayton Ward, Kevin Dilmore, and David Mack. Not all printings include a number stamp.

The Corps of Engineers novella Distant Early Warning (2006), by Dayton Ward and Kevin Dilmore, is a prequel to Vanguard. In Tempest's Wake (2012), by Dayton Ward, serves as an epilogue to the series. The Seekers (2014–15) flagship series is an indirect sequel to Vanguard.

No.	Title	Author(s)	Date	ISBN
1	Harbinger	David Mack	July 26, 2005	1-4165-0774-4
2	Summon the Thunder	Dayton Ward and Kevin Dilmore	June 27, 2006	1-4165-2400-2
3	Reap the Whirlwind	David Mack	May 22, 2007	978-1-4165-3414-3
4	Open Secrets	Dayton Ward	April 28, 2009	978-1-4165-4792-1
5	Precipice	David Mack	November 24, 2009	978-1-4391-3011-7
6	Declassified	Dayton Ward, et al. (Note: Declassified (2011) by Dayton Ward, Kevin Dilmore, Marco Palmieri, and David Mack.)	June 28, 2011	978-1-4516-0691-1
7	What Judgments Come	Dayton Ward and Kevin Dilmore	September 27, 2011	978-1-4516-0863-2
8	Storming Heaven	David Mack	March 27, 2012	978-1-4516-5070-9
9	In Tempest's Wake ◊	Dayton Ward	October 2, 2012	978-1-4516-9589-2

=== Mirror Universe (2007–2011) ===
Star Trek: Mirror Universe explores the Mirror Universe introduced in Star Trek episode "Mirror, Mirror". The Sorrows of Empire (2009) was expanded from a novella collected in Glass Empires (2007). Fearful Symmetry (2008) and The Soul Key (2009), by Olivia Wood, and Disavowed (2014), by David Mack, tie into the series. Not all printings include a number stamp.

No.	Title	Author(s)	Date	ISBN
1	Glass Empires	Michael Sussman, et al. (Note: Glass Empires (2007) by Michael Sussman, with Dayton Ward and Kevin Dilmore, David Mack, and Greg Cox.)	February 20, 2007	978-1-4165-2459-5
2	Obsidian Alliances	Keith DeCandido, Peter David and Sara Shaw (Note: Sara Shaw is pseudonymous with David Mack.)	March 20, 2007	978-1-4165-2471-7
3	Shards and Shadows (short story collection)	Marco Palmieri and Margaret Clark, eds.	January 6, 2009	978-1-4165-5850-7
4	The Sorrows of Empire	David Mack	December 29, 2009	978-1-4391-5516-5
5	Rise Like Lions	David Mack	November 29, 2011	978-1-4516-0719-2

=== Academy (2007) ===
Star Trek: Academy was intended to be a new flagship series featuring a young Midshipman Jim Kirk. A sequel, Trial Run, was announced but was never published.

Title	Author(s)	Date	ISBN
Collision Course †	William Shatner, with Judith and Garfield Reeves-Stevens	October 16, 2007	978-1-4165-0396-5

=== Excelsior (2007) ===
Star Trek: Excelsior was a flagship series concept set aboard the Excelsior (NCC-2000), under the command of Hikaru Sulu. Only one novel has been published, which was marketed as part of The Original Series book line.

Title	Author(s)	Date	ISBN
Forged in Fire	Michael A. Martin and Andy Mangels	December 26, 2007	978-1-4165-4716-7

=== Klingon Empire (2008) ===
Star Trek: Klingon Empire is a relaunch of I.K.S. Gorkon (2003–2005). Only one novel has been published.

Title	Author	Date	ISBN
A Burning House	Keith DeCandido	January 29, 2008	978-1-4165-5647-3

=== Terok Nor (2008) ===
Star Trek: Terok Nor explores the history of the Deep Space Nine station during the Bajoran Occupation when it was known as Terok Nor. The series is linked to the Lost Era (2003–2014). The cover art by John Picacio forms a triptych. Marketed as part of the Deep Space Nine book line.

No.	Title	Author(s)	Date	ISBN
1	Day of the Vipers	James Swallow	March 25, 2008	978-1-4165-5093-8
2	Night of the Wolves	S. D. Perry and Britta Dennison	April 29, 2008	978-0-7434-8251-6
3	Dawn of the Eagles	S. D. Perry and Britta Dennison	May 20, 2008	978-0-7434-8252-3

=== Myriad Universes (2008–2010) ===
Star Trek: Myriad Universes series explores alternate realities, and how those settings affect the analogues of characters from various television series and films. The Last Generation (2008–09) comics miniseries, by Andrew Steven Harris, ties into the series. Not all printings include a number stamp.

No.	Title	Author(s)	Date	ISBN
1	Infinity's Prism	William Leisner, Christopher L. Bennett and James Swallow	July 22, 2008	978-1-4165-7180-3
2	Echoes and Refractions	Geoff Trowbridge, Keith DeCandido and Chris Roberson	August 12, 2008	978-1-4165-7181-0
3	Shattered Light	David R. George III, et al. (Note: Shattered Light (2010) by David R. George III, Steve Mollman and Michael Schuster, and Scott Pearson.)	December 14, 2010	978-1-4391-4841-9

=== Destiny (2008) ===
Star Trek: Destiny crossover miniseries explores the origin of the Borg, and the Federation's response to a destructive invasion by them. Followed by Typhon Pact (2010–2013). An omnibus edition was published in 2012.

No.	Title	Author	Date	ISBN
1	Gods of Night	David Mack	September 30, 2008	978-1-4165-5171-3
2	Mere Mortals	David Mack	October 28, 2008	978-1-4165-5172-0
3	Lost Souls	David Mack	November 25, 2008	978-1-4165-5175-1

=== Kelvin Universe (2009–2020) ===

Based on Star Trek (2009) film reboot and its sequels, Into Darkness (2013) and Beyond (2016). The novels are marketed as part of the Kelvin Timeline or Kelvin Universe, adapted from Kelvin (NCC-0514) whose destruction created the alternate timeline explored in the films and novels.

==== Film novelizations (2009–2013) ====
Star Trek Beyond (2016) did not receive a novelization.

Title	Author	Date	ISBN
Star Trek	Alan Dean Foster	May 12, 2009	978-1-4391-5886-9
Star Trek Into Darkness	Alan Dean Foster	May 21, 2013	978-1-4767-1648-0

==== Starfleet Academy (2010–2012) ====
Star Trek: Starfleet Academy young adult miniseries explores the lives of the Enterprise crew as Starfleet Academy cadets. The series is unrelated to a 1996 series of the same name. Starfleet Academy (1997), a video game novelization by Diane Carey, is also unrelated.

No.	Title †	Author(s)	Date	ISBN
1	The Delta Anomaly	Rick Barba	November 2, 2010	978-1-4424-1409-9
2	The Edge	Rudy Josephs	December 28, 2010	978-1-4424-1408-2
3	The Gemini Agent	Rick Barba	June 28, 2011	978-1-4424-1961-2
4	The Assassination Game	Alan Gratz and Rick Barba	June 26, 2012	978-1-4424-2058-8

==== Original novels (2020) ====
Novels set within the continuity established by the 2009 film.

Title	Author(s)	Date	ISBN
The Unsettling Stars (Note: The Unsettling Stars (2020), by Alan Dean Foster, was previously marketed as Refugees and The Order of Peace.)	Alan Dean Foster	April 14, 2020	978-1-9821-4060-1
More Beautiful Than Death	David Mack	August 11, 2020	978-1-9821-4062-5

=== Star Trek Online (2010) ===
Star Trek Online is based on the MMORPG of the same name. Only one novel has been published.

Title	Author	Date	ISBN
The Needs of the Many	Michael A. Martin	March 30, 2010	978-1-4391-8657-2

=== Typhon Pact (2010–2012) ===
Star Trek: Typhon Pact series explores the political chaos following the destruction of the Borg in Destiny (2008). A Singular Destiny (2009), by Keith DeCandido, introduced the supranational Typhon Pact as the Federation's primary antagonist. Many storylines conclude in The Fall (2013–14). An omnibus edition of the concluding trilogy was published as The Khitomer Accords Saga (2013). Volume numbers vary by language and market.

Title	Author(s)	Date	ISBN
Zero Sum Game	David Mack	October 26, 2010	978-1-4391-6079-4
Seize the Fire	Michael A. Martin	November 30, 2010	978-1-4391-6782-3
Rough Beasts of Empire	David R. George III	December 28, 2010	978-1-4391-6081-7
Paths of Disharmony	Dayton Ward	January 25, 2011	978-1-4391-6083-1
The Struggle Within ◊	Christopher L. Bennett	October 4, 2011	978-1-4516-5142-3
Plagues of Night (Note: Plagues of Night (2012), by David R. George III, was also marketed as At the Prophet's Door.) ‡	David R. George III	May 29, 2012	978-1-4516-4955-0
Raise the Dawn ‡	David R. George III	June 26, 2012	978-1-4516-4956-7
Brinkmanship ‡	Una McCormack	September 25, 2012	978-1-4516-8782-8

=== Department of Temporal Investigations (2011–2017) ===
Star Trek: Department of Temporal Investigations, is based on the fictional Federation agency responsible for investigating time travel incidents. The protagonists, Lucsly and Dulmur, were introduced in the Deep Space Nine episode "Trials and Tribble-ations". Forgotten History (2012) was collected in The Continuing Missions, Volume One (2013) omnibus. Watching the Clock (2011) was published as an ebook exclusive in 2011, but received a paperback release in 2014. Volume numbers vary by language and market.

Title	Author	Date	ISBN
Watching the Clock	Christopher L. Bennett	April 26, 2011	978-1-4516-0625-6
Forgotten History ‡	Christopher L. Bennett	April 24, 2012	978-1-4516-5725-8
The Collectors ◊	Christopher L. Bennett	December 8, 2014	978-1-4767-8259-1
Time Lock ◊	Christopher L. Bennett	September 5, 2016	978-1-5011-2334-4
Shield of the Gods ◊	Christopher L. Bennett	June 19, 2017	978-1-5011-6488-0

=== The Fall (2013) ===
Star Trek: The Fall is a continuation of Typhon Pact (2010–2013). Events in the novels occur over a two-month period, alternating between Deep Space Nine and The Next Generation settings.

No.	Title	Author(s)	Date	ISBN
1	Revelation and Dust	David R. George III	August 27, 2013	978-1-4767-2217-7
2	The Crimson Shadow	Una McCormack	September 24, 2013	978-1-4767-2220-7
3	A Ceremony of Losses	David Mack	October 29, 2013	978-1-4767-2224-5
4	The Poisoned Chalice	James Swallow	November 26, 2013	978-1-4767-2222-1
5	Peaceable Kingdoms	Dayton Ward	December 31, 2013	978-1-4767-1899-6

=== Seekers (2014–15) ===
Star Trek: Seekers is an indirect sequel of Vanguard (2005–2012). The series follows the crews of the Endeavour (NCC-1895) and its companion scout ship, Sagittarius (NCC-1894).

No.	Title	Author(s)	Date	ISBN
1	Second Nature	David Mack	July 22, 2014	978-1-4767-5307-2
2	Point of Divergence	Dayton Ward and Kevin Dilmore	August 26, 2014	978-1-4767-5726-1
3	Long Shot	David Mack	July 28, 2015	978-1-4767-5309-6
4	All That's Left	Dayton Ward and Kevin Dilmore	October 27, 2015	978-1-4767-9860-8

=== Section 31 relaunch (2014–2017) ===
Star Trek: Section 31 miniseries is a relaunch of the Section 31 (2001) crossover miniseries. Events continue in Collateral Damage (2019). Marketed as part of the Deep Space Nine book line.

Title	Author	Date	ISBN
Disavowed	David Mack	October 28, 2014	978-1-4767-5308-9
Control	David Mack	March 28, 2017	978-1-5011-5170-5

=== Prey (2016) ===
Star Trek: Prey follows the exploits of a company of thieves. The series includes characters from The Undiscovered Country (1992), The Next Generation, and Deep Space Nine.

No.	Title	Author	Date	ISBN
1	Hell's Heart	John Jackson Miller	September 27, 2016	978-1-5011-1579-0
2	The Jackal's Trick	John Jackson Miller	October 25, 2016	978-1-5011-1580-6
3	The Hall of Heroes	John Jackson Miller	November 29, 2016	978-1-5011-1603-2

=== Discovery (2017–2023) ===

Star Trek: Discovery book line is based on the television series of the same name. Volume numbers vary by language and market.

Title	Author(s)	Date	ISBN
Desperate Hours	David Mack	September 26, 2017	978-1-5011-6457-6
Drastic Measures	Dayton Ward	February 6, 2018	978-1-5011-7174-1
Fear Itself	James Swallow	June 5, 2018	978-1-5011-6659-4
The Way to the Stars	Una McCormack	January 8, 2019	978-1-9821-0475-7
The Enterprise War	John Jackson Miller	July 30, 2019	978-1-9821-1331-5
Dead Endless	Dave Galanter	December 17, 2019	978-1-9821-2384-0
Die Standing	John Jackson Miller	July 14, 2020	978-1-9821-3629-1
Wonderlands	Una McCormack	May 18, 2021	978-1-9821-5754-8
Somewhere to Belong	Dayton Ward	May 30, 2023	978-1-6680-0229-2

=== Picard (2020–present) ===

Star Trek: Picard is based on the television series of the same name. The Last Best Hope (2020) is a prequel to "Remembrance", the first episode of the television series. The Dark Veil (2021) is linked to Titan (2005–2017). Volume numbers vary by language and market.

Title †	Author	Date	ISBN
The Last Best Hope	Una McCormack	February 11, 2020	978-1-9821-3944-5
The Dark Veil	James Swallow	January 5, 2021	978-1-9821-5406-6
Rogue Elements	John Jackson Miller	August 7, 2021	978-1-9821-7519-1
Second Self	Una McCormack	September 15, 2022	978-1-9821-9482-6
Firewall	David Mack	February 27, 2024	978-1-6680-4635-7
No Man's Land	Kirsten Beyer and Mike Johnson	September 24, 2024	978-1-6680-6613-3
To Defy Fate	Dayton Ward	April 28, 2026	978-1-6680-9779-3

=== Coda (2021) ===
Star Trek: Coda crossover series follows the crews of several starships attempting to prevent the destruction of the universe by the vampiric species encountered in The Next Generation two-part episode "Time's Arrow". Coda serves as a conclusion to the continuity shared by the various relaunch book lines from 2001 to 2021.

No.	Title	Author	Date	ISBN
1	Moments Asunder	Dayton Ward	September 28, 2021	978-1-9821-5852-1
2	The Ashes of Tomorrow	James Swallow	October 26, 2021	978-1-9821-5854-5
3	Oblivion's Gate	David Mack	November 30, 2021	978-1-9821-5967-2

=== Prodigy (2023) ===

Star Trek: Prodigy is a chapter book series based on the television series of the same name. Published by Simon Spotlight.

No.	Title ^†	Author	Date	ISBN
1	A Dangerous Trade	Cassandra Rose Clarke	January 17, 2023	978-1-6659-2117-6
2	Supernova	Robb Pearlman	January 17, 2023	978-1-6659-2542-6
3	Escape Route	Cassandra Rose Clarke	August 1, 2023	978-1-6659-2121-3

=== Strange New Worlds (2023–2025) ===

Star Trek: Strange New Worlds is based on the television series of the same name. The first novel is an introduction to the crew of the Enterprise (NCC-1701) under the command of Christopher Pike. The Strange New Worlds short story series published from 1998 to 2016 is unrelated. Volume numbers vary by language and market.

Title †	Author	Date	ISBN
The High Country	John Jackson Miller	February 21, 2023	978-1-6680-0238-4
Asylum	Una McCormack	November 5, 2024	978-1-6680-5136-8
Toward the Night	James Swallow	April 29, 2025	978-1-6680-7456-5
Ring of Fire	David Mack	October 7, 2025	978-1-6680-9589-8

=== Other works and collections ===
==== Interactive gamebooks ====
Interactive gamebooks similar to Choose Your Own Adventure. Published by various Simon & Schuster imprints.

Title †	Author	Date	ISBN
Star Trek II: The Wrath of Khan – Distress Call!	William Rotsler	December 1982	0-671-46389-6
Star Trek III: The Search for Spock – The Vulcan Treasure	William Rotsler	June 1984	0-671-50138-0
Star Trek: Voyage to Adventure	Michael J. Dodge (Note: Michael J. Dodge is pseudonymous John M. Ford.)	June 1984	0-671-50989-6
Star Trek: Phaser Fight	Barbara & Scott Siegel	December 1986	0-671-63248-5

==== Video game novelizations ====
Novelizations of the Star Trek video games. Star Trek: Klingon (1996) was also dramatized as an audiobook by Hilary Bader. A novelization of Star Trek: Borg (1996), to be adapted by Diane Carey, was announced but never published.

Title	Author(s)	Date	ISBN
Star Trek: Klingon (Note: Novelization of Star Trek: Klingon (1996), an interactive film developed by Simon & Schuster Interactive.) (Note: Similarly named works: Klingon (1996), a video game audio dramatization by Hilary Bader; Klingon (1996), a video game novelization by Dean Wesley Smith and Kristine Kathryn Rusch.)	Dean Wesley Smith and Kristine Kathryn Rusch	May 1996	0-671-00257-0
Starfleet Academy (Note: Novelization of Star Trek: Starfleet Academy (1997), a three-dimensional simulation video game published by Interplay Entertainment.)	Diane Carey	June 1997	0-671-01550-8

==== Crossover novels ====
Crossover novels that feature characters and settings from the various television series and films:

Title	Author(s)	Date	ISBN
Federation †	Judith and Garfield Reeves-Stevens	November 1994	0-671-89422-6
The Badlands, Book One	Susan Wright	December 1999	0-671-03957-1
The Badlands, Book Two	Susan Wright	December 1999	0-671-03958-X
Dark Passions, Book One	Susan Wright	January 2, 2001	0-671-78785-3
Dark Passions, Book Two	Susan Wright	January 2, 2001	0-671-78786-1
Starfleet: Year One	Michael Jan Friedman	February 26, 2002	0-7434-3788-8
The Brave and the Bold, Book One	Keith DeCandido	November 26, 2002	0-7434-1922-7
The Brave and the Bold, Book Two	Keith DeCandido	November 26, 2002	0-7434-1923-5
Engines of Destiny	Gene DeWeese	March 1, 2005	0-671-03702-1
Articles of the Federation	Keith DeCandido	May 24, 2005	1-4165-0015-4
A Singular Destiny	Keith DeCandido	January 27, 2009	978-1-4165-9495-6

==== Omnibus editions ====
Novels from various book lines collected into omnibus editions:

Omnibus	Collected novels	Author(s)	Date	ISBN
New Frontier †	House of Cards	Peter David	February 1998	0-671-01978-3
New Frontier †	Into the Void	Peter David	February 1998	0-671-01978-3
New Frontier †	The Two-Front War	Peter David	February 1998	0-671-01978-3
New Frontier †	End Game	Peter David	February 1998	0-671-01978-3
Invasion!	First Strike (Star Trek, Book 79)	Diane Carey	June 1998	0-671-02185-0
Invasion!	The Soldiers of Fear (The Next Generation, Book 41)	Dean Wesley Smith and Kristine Kathryn Rusch	June 1998	0-671-02185-0
Invasion!	Time's Enemy (Deep Space Nine, Book 16)	L. A. Graf	June 1998	0-671-02185-0
Invasion!	The Final Fury (Voyager, Book 9)	Dafydd ab Hugh	June 1998	0-671-02185-0
Odyssey	The Ashes of Eden	William Shatner	September 1998	0-671-02547-3
Odyssey	The Return	William Shatner	September 1998	0-671-02547-3
Odyssey	Avenger	William Shatner	September 1998	0-671-02547-3
Day of Honor	Ancient Blood (The Next Generation)	Diane Carey	March 1999	0-671-02813-8
Day of Honor	Armageddon Sky (Deep Space Nine)	L. A. Graf	March 1999	0-671-02813-8
Day of Honor	Her Klingon Soul (Voyager)	Michael Jan Friedman	March 1999	0-671-02813-8
Day of Honor	Treaty's Law	Kristine Kathryn Rusch and Dean Wesley Smith	March 1999	0-671-02813-8
Day of Honor	Day of Honor	Michael Jan Friedman	March 1999	0-671-02813-8
Day of Honor	Honor Bound	Diana G. Gallagher	March 1999	0-671-02813-8
The Captain's Table	War Dragons	L. A. Graf	March 2000	0-671-04052-9
The Captain's Table	Dujonian's Hoard (The Next Generation)	Michael Jan Friedman	March 2000	0-671-04052-9
The Captain's Table	The Mist (Deep Space Nine)	Dean Wesley Smith and Kristine Kathryn Rusch	March 2000	0-671-04052-9
The Captain's Table	Fire Ship (Voyager)	Diane Carey	March 2000	0-671-04052-9
The Captain's Table	Once Burned (New Frontier)	Peter David	March 2000	0-671-04052-9
The Captain's Table	Where Sea Meets Sky	Jerry Oltion	March 2000	0-671-04052-9
Millennium (Deep Space Nine)	The Fall of Terok Nor	Judith and Garfield Reeves-Stevens	January 2, 2002	0-7434-4249-0
Millennium (Deep Space Nine)	The War of the Prophets	Judith and Garfield Reeves-Stevens	January 2, 2002	0-7434-4249-0
Millennium (Deep Space Nine)	Inferno	Judith and Garfield Reeves-Stevens	January 2, 2002	0-7434-4249-0
Double Helix (The Next Generation)	Infection	John Gregory Betancourt	October 8, 2002	0-7434-1272-9
Double Helix (The Next Generation)	Vectors	Dean Wesley Smith and Kristine Kathryn Rusch	October 8, 2002	0-7434-1272-9
Double Helix (The Next Generation)	Red Sector	Diane Carey	October 8, 2002	0-7434-1272-9
Double Helix (The Next Generation)	Quarantine	John Vornholt	October 8, 2002	0-7434-1272-9
Double Helix (The Next Generation)	Double or Nothing	Peter David	October 8, 2002	0-7434-1272-9
Double Helix (The Next Generation)	The First Virtue	Michael Jan Friedman and Christie Golden	October 8, 2002	0-7434-1272-9
Rihannsu: The Bloodwing Voyages	My Enemy, My Ally	Diane Duane	December 19, 2006	1-4165-2577-7
Rihannsu: The Bloodwing Voyages	The Romulan Way	Diane Duane and Peter Morwood	December 19, 2006	1-4165-2577-7
Rihannsu: The Bloodwing Voyages	Swordhunt	Diane Duane	December 19, 2006	1-4165-2577-7
Rihannsu: The Bloodwing Voyages	Honor Blade	Diane Duane	December 19, 2006	1-4165-2577-7
Twist of Faith (Deep Space Nine)	Avatar, Book One	S. D. Perry	May 22, 2007	978-1-4165-3415-0
Twist of Faith (Deep Space Nine)	Avatar, Book Two	S. D. Perry	May 22, 2007	978-1-4165-3415-0
Twist of Faith (Deep Space Nine)	Abyss	David Weddle and Jeffrey Lang	May 22, 2007	978-1-4165-3415-0
Twist of Faith (Deep Space Nine)	Demons of Air and Darkness	Keith DeCandido	May 22, 2007	978-1-4165-3415-0
Twist of Faith (Deep Space Nine)	What Lay Beyond: "Horn and Ivory"	Keith DeCandido	May 22, 2007	978-1-4165-3415-0
These Haunted Seas (Note: Omnibus edition includes Mission Gama, Books 1 and 2.) (Deep Space Nine)	Twilight ‡	David R. George III	June 17, 2008	978-1-4165-5639-8
These Haunted Seas (Deep Space Nine)	This Gray Spirit ‡	Heather Jarman	June 17, 2008	978-1-4165-5639-8
Mere Anarchy	Things Fall Apart	Dayton Ward and Kevin Dilmore	March 17, 2009	978-1-4165-9494-9
Mere Anarchy	The Centre Cannot Hold	Mike W. Barr	March 17, 2009	978-1-4165-9494-9
Mere Anarchy	Shadows of the Indignant	Dave Galanter	March 17, 2009	978-1-4165-9494-9
Mere Anarchy	The Darkness Drops Again	Christopher L. Bennett	March 17, 2009	978-1-4165-9494-9
Mere Anarchy	The Blood-Dimmed Tide	Howard Weinstein	March 17, 2009	978-1-4165-9494-9
Mere Anarchy	Its Hour Come Round	Margaret Wander Bonanno	March 17, 2009	978-1-4165-9494-9
Destiny	Gods of Night	David Mack	March 13, 2012	978-1-4516-5724-1
Destiny	Mere Mortals	David Mack	March 13, 2012	978-1-4516-5724-1
Destiny	Lost Souls	David Mack	March 13, 2012	978-1-4516-5724-1
The Khitomer Accords Saga ◊ (Typhon Pact)	Plagues of Night	David R. George III	January 22, 2013	978-1-4767-3334-0
The Khitomer Accords Saga ◊ (Typhon Pact)	Raise the Dawn	David R. George III	January 22, 2013	978-1-4767-3334-0
The Khitomer Accords Saga ◊ (Typhon Pact)	Brinkmanship	Una McCormack	January 22, 2013	978-1-4767-3334-0
The Continuing Missions, (Note: Similarly named works: The Continuing Mission (1997), a The Next Generation cast memoir edited by Judith and Garfield Reeves-Stevens; The Continuing Missions, Volume One (2013), an omnibus edition by Greg Cox, Dayton Ward, and Christopher L. Bennett.) Volume One ◊	The Rings of Time	Greg Cox	January 29, 2013	978-1-4767-3335-7
The Continuing Missions, Volume One ◊	That Which Divides	Dayton Ward	January 29, 2013	978-1-4767-3335-7
The Continuing Missions, Volume One ◊	Forgotten History	Christopher L. Bennett	January 29, 2013	978-1-4767-3335-7

==== Short story collections ====
Collections of short fiction from various book lines:

Title	Editor(s)	Date	ISBN
Legends of the Ferengi (Deep Space Nine)	Robert Hewitt Wolfe and Ira Steven Behr (Note: As by Quark, as told to Robert Hewitt Wolfe and Ira Steven Behr.)	July 1997	0-671-00728-9
Adventures in Time and Space (excerpt collection)	Mary P. Taylor	August 1999	0-671-03415-4
Captain Proton: Defender of Earth (Voyager)	Dean Wesley Smith (Note: As by D.W. "Prof" Smith, Ray Hamil, Lester Lee, and Don Simster.)	November 1999	0-671-03646-7
The Lives of Dax (Note: Originally published as Star Trek: The Lives of Dax. Additional printings included the rounded word mark used for the Star Trek: Deep Space Nine relaunch series.) (Deep Space Nine)	Marco Palmieri	December 1999	0-671-02840-5
Enterprise Logs (Note: Similarly named works: The Enterprise Logs (1976–77), a four-volume omnibus collection of Star Trek comics originally published by Gold Key; Enterprise Logs (2001), a collection of selected excerpts from Star Trek tie-in fiction and related works edited by Carol Greenburg.)	Carol Greenburg	June 2000	0-671-03579-7
The Amazing Stories	John J. Ordover	August 20, 2002	0-7434-4915-0
Prophecy and Change (Deep Space Nine)	Marco Palmieri	September 23, 2003	0-7434-7073-7
No Limits (New Frontier)	Peter David	October 21, 2003	0-7434-7707-3
Tales of the Dominion War	Keith DeCandido	August 3, 2004	0-7434-9171-8
Tales from the Captain's Table	Keith DeCandido	June 14, 2005	1-4165-0520-2
Distant Shores (Voyager)	Marco Palmieri	November 1, 2005	0-7434-9253-6
Constellations	Marco Palmieri	September 5, 2006	0-7434-9254-4
The Sky's the Limit (The Next Generation)	Marco Palmieri	October 16, 2007	978-0-7434-9255-3
Shards and Shadows (Mirror Universe)	Marco Palmieri and Margaret Clark, eds.	January 6, 2009	978-1-4165-5850-7
Seven Deadly Sins	Margaret Clark	March 16, 2010	978-1-4391-0944-1

== Titan Books (1987–2024) ==
A division of the Titan Publishing Group, Titan Books reprinted Simon & Schuster and Bantam Books originals for the United Kingdom market from 1987 to 1995. Penguin Random House distributes Titan's licensed publications to the United States and Canada. Outside of North America, Titan's reprints are the most widely available editions. Many reprints include spelling corrections and unexplained prose changes to the original text.

=== Star Trek reprints (1987–1993) ===
Reprints of Pocket Book's Star Trek novels with different number stamps:

No.	Title ≈	Author(s)	Date (Note: Release date for the United Kingdom.)	ISBN
1	Chain of Attack	Gene DeWeese	March 1987	0-907610-85-4
2	Deep Domain	Howard Weinstein	June 1987	0-907610-86-2
3	Dreams of the Raven	Carmen Carter	July 1987	0-907610-93-5
4	The Romulan Way	Diane Duane and Peter Morwood	August 1987	1-85286-002-2
5	How Much for Just the Planet?	John M. Ford	October 1987	1-85286-018-9
6	Bloodthirst	J. M. Dillard	December 1987	1-85286-039-1
7	The I.D.I.C. Epidemic	Jean Lorrah	February 1988	1-85286-042-1
8	Yesterday's Son	A. C. Crispin	March 1988	1-85286-061-8
9	Time for Yesterday	A. C. Crispin	April 1988	1-85286-063-4
10	The Final Reflection	John M. Ford	May 1988	1-85286-064-2
11	Timetrap	David Dvorkin	June 1988	1-85286-065-0
12	The Vulcan Academy Murders	Jean Lorrah	July 1988	1-85286-066-9
13	The Three-Minute Universe	Barbara Paul	August 1988	1-85286-068-5
14	Star Trek: The Motion Picture (novelization)	Gene Roddenberry	September 1988	1-85286-069-3
15	The Wrath of Khan (novelization)	Vonda N. McIntyre	September 1988	1-85286-071-5
16	Memory Prime	Judith and Garfield Reeves-Stevens	October 1988	1-85286-072-3
17	The Entropy Effect	Vonda N. McIntyre	November 1988	1-85286-073-1
18	The Final Nexus	Gene DeWeese	December 1988	1-85286-096-0
19	The Wounded Sky	Diane Duane	January 1989	1-85286-097-9
20	Vulcan's Glory	D. C. Fontana	February 1989	1-85286-098-7
21	My Enemy, My Ally	Diane Duane	March 1989	1-85286-129-0
22	Double, Double	Michael Jan Friedman	April 1989	1-85286-130-4
23	The Covenant of the Crown	Howard Weinstein	May 1989	1-85286-131-2
24	Corona	Greg Bear	July 1989	1-85286-181-9
25	The Abode of Life	Lee Correy	July 1989	1-85286-182-7
26	Ishmael	Barbara Hambly	July 1989	1-85286-183-5
27	Web of the Romulans	M. S. Murdock	September 1989	1-85286-209-2
28	The Cry of the Onlies	Judy Klass	October 1989	1-85286-210-6
29	Dreadnought!	Diane Carey	November 1989	1-85286-211-4
30	The Kobayashi Maru	Julia Ecklar	November 1989	1-85286-212-2
31	The Trellisane Confrontation	David Dvorkin	January 1990	1-85286-224-6
32	The Rules of Engagement	Peter Morwood	February 1990	1-85286-281-5
33	The Klingon Gambit	Robert E. Vardeman	March 1990	1-85286-282-3
34	The Pandora Principle	Carolyn Clowes	April 1990	1-85286-283-1
35	The Prometheus Design	Sondra Marshak and Myrna Culbreath	May 1990	1-85286-284-X
36	Doctor's Orders	Diane Duane	June 21, 1990	1-85286-285-8
37	Black Fire	Sonni Cooper	July 19, 1990	1-85286-308-0
38	Killing Time	Della Van Hise	August 16, 1990	1-85286-309-9
39	The Tears of the Singers	Melinda Snodgrass	September 20, 1990	1-85286-314-5
40	Enemy Unseen	V. E. Mitchell	October 25, 1990	1-85286-315-3
41	Mindshadow	J. M. Dillard	November 15, 1990	1-85286-316-1
42	Home Is the Hunter	Dana Kramer-Rolls	November 29, 1990	1-85286-317-X
43	Demons	J. M. Dillard	January 31, 1991	1-85286-351-X
44	Ghost-Walker	Barbara Hambly	February 14, 1991	1-85286-352-8
45	Mutiny on the Enterprise	Robert E. Vardeman	March 21, 1991	1-85286-353-6
46	A Flag Full of Stars	Brad Ferguson	April 25, 1991	1-85286-354-4
47	Crisis on Centaurus	Brad Ferguson	May 23, 1991	1-85286-355-2
48	Renegade	Gene DeWeese	June 20, 1991	1-85286-356-0
49	Triangle	Sondra Marshak and Myrna Culbreath	July 11, 1991	1-85286-357-9
50	Legacy	Michael Jan Friedman	August 22, 1991	1-85286-382-X
51	Battlestations!	Diane Carey	September 19, 1991	1-85286-361-7
52	The Rift	Peter David	November 21, 1991	1-85286-389-7
53	Faces of Fire	Michael Jan Friedman	March 19, 1992	1-85286-390-0
54	The Disinherited	Robert Greenberger, Michael Jan Friedman and Peter David	May 21, 1992	1-85286-391-9
55	Ice Trap	L. A. Graf	July 23, 1992	1-85286-427-3
56	Sanctuary	John Vornholt	August 24, 1992	1-85286-428-1
57	Death Count	L. A. Graf	September 30, 1992	1-85286-429-X
58	Shell Game	Melissa Crandall	January 28, 1993	1-85286-459-1
59	The Starship Trap	Mel Gilden	March 19, 1993	1-85286-460-5
60	Windows on a Lost World	V. E. Mitchell	May 25, 1993	1-85286-461-3
61	From the Depths	Victor Milan	August 5, 1993	1-85286-467-2
62	The Great Starship Race	Diane Carey	September 30, 1993	1-85286-489-3

=== Giant Novel reprints (1987–1990) ===
Reprints of select novels marketed as Star Trek Giant Novels, each featuring step-back cover art by Boris Vallejo. The reprint of Enterprise: The First Voyage, by Vonda N. McIntyre, was scheduled for a September 1987 release but was withdrawn for unknown reasons.

Title ≈	Author(s)	Date	ISBN
Enterprise: The First Voyage (not released)	Vonda N. McIntyre	September 1987	—
Strangers from the Sky	Margaret Wander Bonanno	October 1987	1-85286-008-1
Uhura's Song	Janet Kagan	May 1989	1-85286-184-3
Dwellers in the Crucible	Margaret Wander Bonanno	September 1989	1-85286-206-8
Shadow Lord	Laurence Yep	April 1990	1-85286-287-4
Pawns and Symbols	Majliss Larson	September 27, 1990	1-85286-323-4

=== New Voyages reprints (1992) ===
Reprints of Star Trek: The New Voyages short story collections. Both volumes include spelling corrections and unexplained prose changes.

Title ≈	Editor(s)	Date	ISBN
The New Voyages	Sondra Marshak and Myrna Culbreath	August 27, 1992	1-85286-448-6
The New Voyages 2	Sondra Marshak and Myrna Culbreath	December 16, 1992	1-85286-453-2

=== Star Trek Adventures reprints (1993–1995) ===
Reprints of Bantam's Star Trek Adventures excluding Spock Must Die! (1970) and Spock, Messiah! (1976). (Note: Similarly named works: Star Trek Adventures (1970–1981) , an original novel series published by Bantam Books; Star Trek Adventures (1993–1995), series reprints by Titan Books; Star Trek Adventures, a tabletop role-playing game published by Modiphius Entertainment.) Some printings include spelling corrections and unexplained prose changes.

No.	Title ≈	Author(s)	Date	ISBN
1	The Galactic Whirlpool	David Gerrold	June 29, 1993	1-85286-486-9
2	The Price of the Phoenix	Sondra Marshak and Myrna Culbreath	November 1, 1993	1-85286-504-0
3	The Starless World	Gordon Eklund	January 27, 1994	1-85286-505-9
4	Perry's Planet	Jack C. Haldeman	February 24, 1994	1-85286-509-1
5	Mudd's Angels (short story collection)	J. A. Lawrence	April 14, 1994	1-85286-510-5
6	Trek to Madworld	Stephen Goldin	June 23, 1994	1-85286-530-X
7	Planet of Judgment	Joe Haldeman	August 11, 1994	1-85286-531-8
8	Devil World	Gordon Eklund	October 20, 1994	1-85286-532-6
9	The Fate of the Phoenix	Sondra Marshak and Myrna Culbreath	December 15, 1994	1-85286-535-0
10	Death's Angel	Kathleen Sky	February 16, 1995	1-85286-536-9
11	Vulcan!	Kathleen Sky	April 20, 1995	1-85286-537-7
12	World Without End	Joe Haldeman	June 22, 1995	1-85286-538-5

=== Autobiography series (2015–2023) ===
Autobiographies as written by the titular characters. The authors are credited as "editors". The series follows the continuity of the television series and films. The Autobiography of Mr. Spock was previously scheduled for release in 2018, but was rescheduled for unknown reasons. Volume numbers vary by language and market.

Title †	Author(s) (Note: Credited as editor.)	Date	ISBN
The Autobiography of James T. Kirk (Note: Book design and production by becker&mayer!, an imprint of The Quarto Group.)	David A. Goodman	September 11, 2015	978-1-78329-746-7
The Autobiography of Jean-Luc Picard	David A. Goodman	October 17, 2017	978-1-78565-465-7
The Autobiography of Kathryn Janeway	Una McCormack	October 5, 2020	978-1-78909-479-4
The Autobiography of Mr. Spock	Una McCormack	September 7, 2021	978-1-78565-466-4
The Autobiography of Benjamin Sisko	Derek Tyler Attico	October 10, 2023	978-1-80336-623-4

=== Prometheus English reprints (2017–18) ===
English-language reprints of Star Trek: Prometheus. The novels received a continuity edit by Keith DeCandido.

No.	Title ≈	Author(s)	Date	ISBN
1	Fire with Fire	Christian Humberg and Bernd Perplies, with Helga Parmiter, translator	November 28, 2017	978-1-78565-649-1
2	The Root of All Rage	Christian Humberg and Bernd Perplies, with Helga Parmiter, translator	June 12, 2018	978-1-78565-651-4
3	In the Heart of Chaos	Christian Humberg and Bernd Perplies, with Helga Parmiter, translator	November 27, 2018	978-1-78565-653-8

=== Titan Bookazines ===
Short story collections published by Titan Comics in 'bookazine' format.

Title †	Author(s)	Date	ISBN
Star Trek: The Short Story Collection	Christine Thompson, et al. (Note: Christine Thompson, Jaddua Ross, Jesse Heinig, Katherine Bankson, Paul Reed, Sean McCann and Tyler Nagata)	November 8, 2022	978-1-78773-861-4

==== Star Trek Explorer Presents (2022–2024) ====
Illustrated short fiction commissioned for Star Trek Explorer magazine.

Vol.	Title †	Author(s)	Date	ISBN
1	"Q and False" and Other Stories	Chris Dows, et al. (Note: Chris Dows, Greg Cox, James Swallow, Lisa Klink and Una McCormack)	December 13, 2022	978-1-78773-862-1
2	"The Mission" and Other Stories	Chris Cooper, et al. (Note: Chris Cooper, Chris Dows, Gary Russell, Greg Cox, James Swallow, John Peel, Mike Carroll, Mike Collins and Una McCormack)	February 13, 2024	978-1-78773-963-5
3	"A Year to the Day That I Saw Myself Die" and Other Stories	Chris Dows, et al. (Note: Chris Dows, David Mack, Greg Cox, Una McCormack and Walter Koenig)	December 10, 2024	978-1-78773-964-2

== Other licensed works ==
Below is an incomplete list of licensed works from other publishers:

=== Mission to Horatius (1968–1999) ===
Star Trek: Mission to Horatius (1968) was the first young adult novel to be based on the television series, and the only novel to be published while the series aired on NBC. Published by Whitman Books as part of a book line based on popular television properties. As with other Whitman titles, the novel was released to libraries, booksellers, and news agents, on different dates. A facsimile edition was published by Pocket Books in 1999.

Title †^	Author(s)	Publisher	Date	Catalog / ISBN
Mission to Horatius	Mack Reynolds	Whitman Books	1968	1549
Mission to Horatius (facsimile)	Mack Reynolds and John Ordover, ed.	Pocket Books	February 1999	0-671-02812-X

=== Star Trek Reader (1976–1978) ===
The Star Trek Reader is a four-volume, limited-edition collection of Jame's Blish's adaptations of The Original Series. Spock Must Die! (1970), also by Blish, was included in Volume IV. Published by E. P. Dutton. Variants were made available to the Science Fiction Book Club from 1976 to 1979.

Title †	Author	Date	ISBN
The Star Trek Reader	James Blish	October 1976	0-8415-0467-9
The Star Trek Reader II	James Blish	April 1977	0-525-20960-3
The Star Trek Reader III	James Blish	September 1977	0-525-20961-1
The Star Trek Reader IV	James Blish	March 1978	0-525-20962-X

=== Science Fiction Book Club (1998–2007) ===
The Science Fiction Book Club has published omnibus editions of Star Trek miniseries exclusively for club members. Variants intended for libraries are also known to exist. Below is an incomplete list:

Omnibus †≈	Collected novels	Author(s)	Date	ISBN
Star Trek: New Frontier	House of Cards	Peter David	January 1998	1-56865-502-9
Star Trek: New Frontier	Into the Void	Peter David	January 1998	1-56865-502-9
Star Trek: New Frontier	The Two-Front War	Peter David	January 1998	1-56865-502-9
Star Trek: New Frontier	End Game	Peter David	January 1998	1-56865-502-9
Star Trek: Prometheans (New Frontier)	Martyr	Peter David	July 1998	1-56865-742-0
Star Trek: Prometheans (New Frontier)	Fire on High	Peter David	July 1998	1-56865-742-0
Star Trek: The Q Continuum (The Next Generation)	Q-Space	Greg Cox	November 1998	1-56865-954-7
Star Trek: The Q Continuum (The Next Generation)	Q-Zone	Greg Cox	November 1998	1-56865-954-7
Star Trek: The Q Continuum (The Next Generation)	Q-Strike	Greg Cox	November 1998	1-56865-954-7
Star Trek: Rihannsu	My Enemy, My Ally	Diane Duane	October 2000	0-7394-1390-2
Star Trek: Rihannsu	The Romulan Way	Diane Duane and Peter Morwood	October 2000	0-7394-1390-2
Star Trek: Rihannsu	Swordhunt	Diane Duane	October 2000	0-7394-1390-2
Star Trek: Rihannsu	Honor Blade	Diane Duane	October 2000	0-7394-1390-2
Star Trek: The Genesis Wave (The Next Generation)	The Genesis Wave, Book One	John Vornholt	June 2001	0-7394-1843-2
Star Trek: The Genesis Wave (The Next Generation)	The Genesis Wave, Book Two	John Vornholt	June 2001	0-7394-1843-2
Star Trek: The Genesis Wave (The Next Generation)	The Genesis Wave, Book Three	John Vornholt	June 2001	0-7394-1843-2
Star Trek: Stargazer	Gauntlet	Michael Jan Friedman	June 2002	0-7394-2617-6
Star Trek: Stargazer	Progenitor	Michael Jan Friedman	June 2002	0-7394-2617-6
Star Trek: The Janus Gate	Present Tense	L. A. Graf	October 2002	0-7394-2854-3
Star Trek: The Janus Gate	Future Imperfect	L. A. Graf	October 2002	0-7394-2854-3
Star Trek: The Janus Gate	Past Prologue	L. A. Graf	October 2002	0-7394-2854-3
Star Trek: Vulcan's Soul	Exodus	Josepha Sherman and Susan Shwartz	April 2007	978-0-7394-8205-6
Star Trek: Vulcan's Soul	Exiles	Josepha Sherman and Susan Shwartz	April 2007	978-0-7394-8205-6
Star Trek: Vulcan's Soul	Epiphany	Josepha Sherman and Susan Shwartz	April 2007	978-0-7394-8205-6

=== Classic Episodes (2016) ===
Star Trek: The Classic Episodes (2016) collects many of James Blish's and J. A. Lawrence's adaptations of The Original Series into a single volume. Published by Barnes & Noble as part of the Collectible Editions series.

Title	Author	Date	ISBN
The Classic Episodes † (short story collection)	James Blish and J. A. Lawrence	April 29, 2016	978-0-385-36524-6

=== Prometheus (2016) ===
Star Trek: Prometheus is a German-language flagship concept series commissioned by Cross Cult as part of Star Trek's 50th Anniversary celebration. English translation was published by Titan Books in 2017.

No.	Title	Author(s)	Date	ISBN
1	Feuer gegen Feuer	Christian Humberg and Bernd Perplies	July 29, 2016	978-3-86425-851-0
2	Der Ursprung allen Zorns	Christian Humberg and Bernd Perplies	August 22, 2016	978-3-86425-852-7
3	Ins Herz des Chaos	Christian Humberg and Bernd Perplies	September 19, 2016	978-3-86425-853-4

== Unpublished novels and anthologies ==
Below is an incomplete list of unpublished Star Trek novels and anthologies.

=== Bantam Books (1978–1981) ===
The following is an incomplete list of unpublished novels attributed to Bantam Books:

Tentative Title	Author(s)	Scheduled	Ref.
Uhura!	Nichelle Nichols, with Sondra Marshak and Myrna Culbreath	1977–1981	
The New Voyages 3	Sondra Marshak and Myrna Culbreath, ed.	1977–1981	
The New Voyages 4	Sondra Marshak and Myrna Culbreath, ed.	1977–1981	
The Harlequin Game	Steven E. McDonald	1977–1981	
Mirrorgates	Steven E. McDonald	1977–1981	
Moonchild	Steven E. McDonald	1977–1981	

=== Simon & Schuster (1979–2019) ===
The following is an incomplete list of unpublished novels attributed to Simon & Schuster:

Tentative Title	Author(s)	Scheduled	Known ISBN (Note: ISBN listed in publisher solicitations, bookseller or library catalogs, or library notices, prior to a work's withdrawal from publication.)	Ref.
The God Thing	Gene Roddenberry, et al. (Note: The God Thing is an unpublished novel attributed to Gene Roddenberry. Other attributed authors include Walter Koenig, Susan Sackett, Fred Bronson, Michael Jan Friedman, David Alexander, Keith DeCandido, Gene DeWeese, and John Vornholt.)	1979–1994	0-671-78070-0	
The War Virus (Note: Planned as part of The Lost Years series.)	Irene Kress	1990–91	—	
By Logic Alone (Note: Planned as part of The Fortune of War miniseries.)	Diane Carey	1989–1992	—	
The Federation Mutiny, Books 1 – 2	Diane Carey	1989–1992	—	
Star Trek: Borg (Note: Novelization to be based on Star Trek: Borg (1996), an interactive movie game published by Simon & Schuster Interactive.) (novelization)	Diane Carey	1996	—	
A Stitch in Time sequel	Andrew Robinson and Alexander Siddig	2000	—	
Millennium, Books 1 – 2	L. A. Graf	2000–2002	—	
Starfleet: Year Two	Michael Jan Friedman	2000–2002	—	
Unimatrix Zero (novelization) (Voyager)	Diane Carey	2000–01	0-671-55193-0	
Walking Wounded (Deep Space Nine)	Bradley Thompson	2001–2005	—	
Gateways † (omnibus)	John J. Ordover, ed.	2001–2005	—	
Harm's Way, Books 1 – 3	Jerry Oltion and Kathy Oltion	2003–2007	—	
Tzenkethi War (short story collection) (The Lost Era)	Marco Palmieri, ed.	2003–2007	—	
A Time to Create (Note: Planned as part of the A Time to... miniseries.) (The Next Generation)	Dafydd ab Hugh	August 2004	—	
A Time to Destroy (The Next Generation)	Dafydd ab Hugh	September 2004	—	
Trial Run (Academy)	William Shatner, with Judith and Garfield Reeves-Stevens	2008–2010	—	
Crucible † (omnibus)	David R. George III	May 5, 2009	978-1-4391-0248-0	
Song of Innocence (Note: Planned as part of The Orion Factor miniseries.)	Kevin Ryan	2009–2014	978-0-7434-9165-5	
Song of Experience	Kevin Ryan	2009–2014	978-0-7434-9166-2	
Fearful Symmetry	Kevin Ryan	2009–2014	978-0-7434-9167-9	
Millennium Bloom (The Next Generation)	Mike W. Barr	2010–11	978-1-4391-0220-6	
Seek a Newer World	Christopher L. Bennett	May 25, 2010	978-1-4165-9816-9	
The Hazard of Concealing	Greg Cox	July 27, 2010	978-1-4391-8414-1	
Third Class (Academy)	William Shatner, with Judith and Garfield Reeves-Stevens	December 31, 2019	978-1-4165-0399-6	

== See also ==
- List of Star Trek tie-in fiction – Works written from an in-universe perspective, such as atlas, histories, and retrospectives.
- TekWar – Science fiction novel series written by William Shatner.
