= Star Trek (Bantam Books) =

Novel series based on television series

- Author: Various
- Country: United States
- Language: English
- Genre: Science fiction
- Publisher: Bantam Books
- Published: 1967–1991
- Media type: Print (Paperback)
- No. of books: 43

In 1966, Bantam Books acquired the license to publish tie-in fiction based on the science fiction television series Star Trek.

Bantam published a series of novelizations based on episodes of the television series from 1967 to 1978. From 1970 to 1981, a range of original novels, anthologies, and reference books followed. Bantam also produced a line of photo comics which adapted popular episodes of the television series using full-color photographic stills.

Many of Bantam's Star Trek releases remained in print until 1991.

== Production ==
=== Episode novelizations ===
James Blish was known to have expressed an extreme dislike for tie-in fiction; however, he accepted the commission from Bantam Books to novelize episodes of Star Trek, at $2,000 per volume. He later stated his financial stability stemmed from the publication of the novelizations, which likely included the commission for Spock Must Die! (1970), which earned him a $3,000 advance (equivalent to $26,338 in 2025).

Prior to his relocation to the United Kingdom in 1969, Blish had not seen the NBC broadcasts of Star Trek. Nor was he involved in the production of the series in any capacity. His only sources for the adaptations were the draft teleplays sent to him by Desilu. Adaptations published after 1970 aligned more with the narrative tone and pacing from the television series, indicating Blish had seen some episodes, mostly likely via broadcasts by the BBC, which began in the summer of 1969.

Blish was credited exclusively for eleven volumes, although it was later acknowledged that volumes published after Star Trek 6 (1972) were written in collaboration with his wife J. A. Lawrence and her mother, Muriel Lawrence, who was also Blish's assistant. Blish commented favorably about the series in each of his "Author's Notes", however, Josephine Saxton said Blish was "so affected to despise" Star Trek that he did not write any of Star Trek 10 (1974). Blish's personal feelings regarding the merit of Star Trek were expressed by the pun "an enterprise so well conceived" in the "Author's Note" of Spock Must Die!.

Bantam editor Frederik Pohl was unaware of the Lawrences' contributions until sometime in 1973. Star Trek 12 (1977), published after Blish's death in 1975, was co-credited to J. A. Lawrence.

Adaptations of episodes involving the character Harry Mudd were reserved by Blish for inclusion in an original novel, possibly a follow-up to Spock Must Die! However, it is unknown if the book was ever realized. The novelizations of "Mudd's Women" and "I, Mudd" were collected as Mudd's Angels (1978), (Note: Many sources claim the title Mudd's Angels is an allusion to Charlie's Angels. This is not proven.) which included an original novella by Lawrence: The Business, as Usual, During Altercations. Lawrence confirmed the Mudd novelizations were written by Blish, and not by her.

=== Photo comics ===
In 1977, Bantam published the first volume in a series of full-color, photo comics adapting twelve popular episodes. Marketed as a Star Trek Fotonovel, (Note: Other Simon & Schuster photo comics were also marketed as Fotonovels. It is unclear if Simon & Schuster ever held that word mark.) each novel utilized still frames taken from film master of each episode. A format advertised as "action photographs". The images were then overlaid with speech bubbles, with typeset text for dialogue, thoughts and action. Many scenes are either condensed, removed, or altered to fit the available space. Mandala Productions, who produced the series, said their goal was to publish "accurate and faithful recreations" of the episodes. The series included novelizations of "The City on the Edge of Forever" and "Amok Time", all credited to the original teleplay writers.

=== Original novels ===
Frederik Pohl was given control of Bantam's Star Trek line in 1972, but he later admitted to not paying much attention to the television series, or the book line. When Joe Haldeman asked who was responsible for new Star Trek novels, Pohl answered "You are!" According to Stephen Goldin, Pohl recruited writers who he felt were dependable enough "to do Star Trek." Among the first writers Pohl reached out to was his long-time friend Theodore Cogswell, whom he tasked with getting the crew of the Enterprise "off the damned ship!"

The second original novel, Spock, Messiah!, by Cogswell and Charles Spano, was published in September 1976. The Price of the Phoenix, by Sondra Marshak and Myrna Culbreath, and Planet of Judgment, by Joe Haldeman, followed in 1977.

After completing his second Star Trek novel, World Without End (1979), Haldeman was "fed up…" and left the Star Trek "enterprise" at "warp factor five". Haldeman said he wrote his first novel to explore writing when all the "characters are already known to the readers," but did not expect to do a second. In an interview with Fast Forward, Haldeman said that despite his desire to write for Star Trek, he did not feel he could conform to the process of writing tie-in fiction.

Other writers recruited by Pohl felt differently about their experience. Gordon Eklund said that Star Trek left room "for just about anything you might want to write." Kathleen Sky, who wrote Vulcan! (1978) and Death's Angel (1981), said Paramount and Pohl made very few requests, except to add "more aliens" and for the last novel to give "Kirk a romance."

=== Short fiction and reference works ===
Writer Jacqueline Lichtenberg had begun research on the Star Trek phenomenon and fandom in the early 1970s. Her intention was to write a newspaper feature on the subject, but her research amassed enough material for a reference work. A query package was assembled and submitted to the major publishers, but the query was rejected by all, including Bantam Books. Following a delay in the production of a new novel from James Blish, Frederik Pohl acquired the query. After two years of additional research, drafting and rewrites, Star Trek Lives! was published in 1975. A sequel has been suggested by Lichtenberg, but has never been realized.

Star Trek Lives! was a bestseller, and Pohl began exploring the possibility of publishing an anthology of fan-written stories based on the television series. Fan fiction was explored in the last chapter of Star Trek Lives!, and co-writer Sondra Marshak, along with her writing partner Myrna Culbreath, had collected a number of fan-written stories to potentially anthologize. Pohl eventually encouraged Marshak and Culbreath to move forward with an anthology after persuading Paramount Pictures such a book would be "impeccably professional." The New Voyages was published in 1976, and collected nine short stories, all had been previously published in Star Trek fanzines, such as T-Negative and Spockanalia. A second volume, The New Voyages 2, was published in 1978, which included a short story written by Nichelle Nichols. Additional volumes were announced by Marshak and Culbreath, but none were published.

Star Trek Maps, designed by Jeffrey Maynard, was published by Bantam in 1980. The box set included four four-color wall maps, and a detailed instructional booklet demonstrating the navigation system utilized by the television series. Highly praised, the charts received special mention during the 1992 Star Trek Exhibition presented by the National Air & Space Museum.

=== Reprints and cover art ===
The novelizations by Blish and Lawrence were reprinted many times, often with new cover art. The first volume, Star Trek 1, received twenty-nine printings between 1967 and 1980; the cover art was originally created by illustrator James Bama as part of an advertising campaign for NBC. Star Trek 11 was reprinted as Day of the Dove in 1985, along with the entire range of original novels, with new cover art by Eric Torres-Prat.

From 1993 to 2000, the original novels and The New Voyages anthologies were reprinted by Spectra, featuring cover art by Japanese artist Kazuhiko Sano. Mudd's Angels was reprinted as Mudd's Enterprise as part of that run.

The adaptations and original novels have been translated and reprinted by various other publishers in Western Europe, Japan, Turkey and Israel.

=== License and rights ===
The license for tie-in fiction was awarded to Pocket Books sometime prior to the release of the novelization of Star Trek: The Motion Picture (1979). However, three original novels, and one reference book, Star Trek Maps (1980), were published by Bantam following this change. Pocket Books opened their own line of original novels with the release of The Entropy Effect (1981), by Vonda N. McIntyre. None of the lines created by Bantam were continued.

The copyrights to the episode novelizations, photo comics, and original novels are now held by CBS. As of August 2019, none of Bantam's Star Trek titles are available in electronic formats. All titles are out of print.

The copyright and publishing rights for Star Trek Lives! have since reverted to the original authors. Lichtenberg has attempted to release the book in electronic formats. However, she has been unable to gain the necessary permissions from her co-writers, or in the case of Joan Winston, her estate.

== Bibliography ==
=== Episode novelizations (1967–1994) ===
Collected adaptations of the Original Series episodes:

Title	Author(s)	Date	Catalog / ISBN
Star Trek 1 (Note: Originally published as Star Trek in 1967. Retitled Star Trek 1 when reprinted from 1975 to 1981.)	James Blish	January 1967	F3459
Star Trek 2	James Blish	February 1968	F3439
Star Trek 3	James Blish	April 1969	F4371
Star Trek 4	James Blish	July 1971	S7009
Star Trek 5	James Blish	February 1972	S7300
Star Trek 6	James Blish	April 1972	S7364
Star Trek 7	James Blish	July 1972	S7480
Star Trek 8	James Blish	November 1972	SP7550
Star Trek 9	James Blish	August 1973	SP7808
Star Trek 10	James Blish	February 1974	SP8401
Star Trek 11 (Note: Star Trek 11 (1975), by James Blish, was reprinted as The Day of the Dove (1985).)	James Blish	April 1975	Q8717
Star Trek 12	James Blish and J. A. Lawrence	November 1977	0-553-11382-8
Mudd's Angels (Note: Mudd's Angels (1978), by J.A. Lawrence, was reprinted as Mudd's Enterprise (1994).) (Star Trek Adventures, Book 7)	J. A. Lawrence	May 1978	0-553-11802-1

=== Original novels (1970–1981) ===
Bantam never applied an official series name to the novels, instead marketing each volume as a new or original "Star Trek Adventure". The novels are not numbered; however, library catalogs and booksellers applied numbers to the novels in publication order, including Mudd's Angels and The New Voyages. In 1993, the series was reprinted by Titan Books as Star Trek Adventures using a different number scheme. The name given to the reprint series has been retroactively applied to Bantam's series by book discovery websites such as LibraryThing.

No.	Title	Author(s)	Date	Catalog / ISBN
1	Spock Must Die!	James Blish	February 1970	H5515
2	The New Voyages (short story collection)	Sondra Marshak and Myrna Culbreath, eds.	March 1976	X2719 (Note: ISBN 0-553-02719-0 based on catalog number X2719 was used by booksellers.)
3	Spock, Messiah!	Theodore Cogswell and Charles A. Spano, Jr.	September 1976	0-553-10159-5
4	The Price of the Phoenix	Sondra Marshak and Myrna Culbreath	July 1977	0-553-10978-2
5	Planet of Judgment	Joe Haldeman	August 1977	0-553-11145-0
6	The New Voyages 2 (short story collection)	Sondra Marshak and Myrna Culbreath, eds.	January 1978	0-553-11392-5
7	Mudd's Angels (short story collection)	J. A. Lawrence	May 1978	0-553-11802-1
8	Vulcan! (Note: Similarly named works: Vulcan! (1978), a novel by Kathleen Sky; Vulcan (2017), a Hidden Universe fictional reference by Dayton Ward.)	Kathleen Sky	September 1978	0-553-12137-5
9	The Starless World	Gordon Eklund	November 1978	0-553-12371-8
10	Trek to Madworld	Stephen Goldin	January 1979	0-553-12618-0
11	World Without End	Joe Haldeman	February 1979	0-553-12583-4
12	The Fate of the Phoenix	Sondra Marshak and Myrna Culbreath	May 1979	0-553-12779-9
13	Devil World	Gordon Eklund	November 1979	0-553-13297-0
14	Perry's Planet	Jack C. Haldeman	February 1980	0-553-13580-5
15	The Galactic Whirlpool	David Gerrold	October 1980	0-553-14242-9
16	Death's Angel	Kathleen Sky	April 1981	0-553-14703-X

=== Reference works (1975–1980) ===
Title	Author(s)	Date	Catalog / ISBN
Star Trek Lives!	Jacqueline Lichtenberg, Sondra Marshak and Joan Winston	July 1975	Y2151
Star Trek Puzzle Manual	James Razzi, ed.	October 1976	0-553-01054-9
Star Trek Maps (box set)	Jeffrey Maynard, et al.	August 1980	0-553-01202-9

=== New Voyages (1976–1977) ===
Star Trek: The New Voyages collects fan fiction curated and edited by Sondra Marshak and Myrna Culbreath. Additional volumes were announced, but none were published. Pocket Books's Strange New Worlds (1998–2016), edited by Dean Wesley Smith, is similar. The collections are books 2 and 6 in Bantam's original novels series.

Title	Editor(s)	Date	Catalog / ISBN
The New Voyages (Star Trek Adventures, Book 2)	Sondra Marshak and Myrna Culbreath	March 1976	X2719
The New Voyages 2 (Star Trek Adventures, Book 6)	Sondra Marshak and Myrna Culbreath	January 1978	0-553-11392-5

=== Star Trek Fotonovel (1977–78) ===
Photo comics:

No.	Title	Author(s)	Date	ISBN
1	City on the Edge of Forever	Harlan Ellison	November 1977	0-553-11345-3
2	Where No Man Has Gone Before	Samuel A. Peeples	November 1977	0-553-11346-1
3	The Trouble With Tribbles	David Gerrold	December 1977	0-553-11347-X
4	A Taste of Armageddon	Robert Hamner and Gene L. Coon	January 1978	0-553-11348-8
5	Metamorphosis	Gene L. Coon	February 1978	0-553-11349-6
6	All Our Yesterdays	Jean Lisette Aroeste	March 1978	0-553-11350-X
7	The Galileo 7	Oliver Crawford and S. Bar-David	May 1978	0-553-12041-7
8	A Piece of the Action	David P. Harmon and Gene L. Coon	June 1978	0-553-12022-0
9	The Devil in the Dark	Gene L. Coon	July 1978	0-553-12021-2
10	Day of the Dove	Jerome Bixby	August 1978	0-553-12017-4
11	The Deadly Years	David P. Harmon	September 1978	0-553-12028-X
12	Amok Time	Theodore Sturgeon	October 1978	0-553-12012-3

=== Classic Episodes (1991) ===
Star Trek: The Classic Episodes omnibus edition collected the novelizations in three volumes. Unlike previous editions the episodes are sorted by television series episode order. New material by D. C. Fontana, Norman Spinrad, and others, are also included. Due to rights issues, the novelizations of "Mudd's Women" and "I, Mudd" were not included, nor was Lawrence's novella The Business, as Usual, During Altercations.

Title	Author(s)	Date	ISBN
The Classic Episodes 1 (Note: Includes all Star Trek, Season 1 episodes, except "Mudd's Women".)	James Blish and J. A. Lawrence	August 1991	0-553-29138-6
The Classic Episodes 2 (Note: Includes all Star Trek, Season 2 episodes, except "I, Mudd".)	James Blish and J. A. Lawrence	August 1991	0-553-29139-4
The Classic Episodes 3 (Note: Includes all Star Trek, Season 3 episodes.)	James Blish and J. A. Lawrence	August 1991	0-553-29140-8

== Related works ==
=== Star Trek Reader (1976–1978) ===
The episode novelizations by Blish, including Spock Must Die! (1970), were collected in a four volume omnibus published by E. P. Dutton. Variants were also made available to the Science Fiction Book Club.

Title	Author	Date	ISBN
The Star Trek Reader	James Blish	October 1976	0-8415-0467-9
The Star Trek Reader II	James Blish	August 1977	0-525-20960-3
The Star Trek Reader III	James Blish	September 1977	0-525-20961-1
The Star Trek Reader IV	James Blish	April 1978	0-525-20962-X

=== Titan Books (1992–1995) ===
Reprints intended for the U.K. and Australian / New Zealand markets.

==== New Voyages reprints (1992) ====
Reprints of Star Trek: The New Voyages short story collections edited by Sondra Marshak and Myrna Culbreath. Both volumes include significant spelling corrections and unexplained prose changes.

Title	Editors(s)	Date	ISBN
The New Voyages	Sondra Marshak and Myrna Culbreath	August 27, 1992	1-85286-448-6
The New Voyages 2	Sondra Marshak and Myrna Culbreath	December 16, 1992	1-85286-453-2

==== Star Trek Adventures reprints (1993–1995) ====
Bantam Book's original novels were reprinted by Titan as Star Trek Adventures. The series name has since been erroneously applied to the Bantam editions by book discovery websites. Many reprints includes significant corrections and spelling changes. Not all printings include a number stamp.

No.	Title (Note: Some printings include significant spelling corrections and or unexplained prose changes.)	Author(s)	Date	ISBN
1	The Galactic Whirlpool	David Gerrold	June 29, 1993	1-85286-486-9
2	The Price of the Phoenix	Sondra Marshak and Myrna Culbreath	November 1, 1993	1-85286-504-0
3	The Starless World	Gordon Eklund	January 27, 1994	1-85286-505-9
4	Perry's Planet	Jack C. Haldeman, II.	February 24, 1994	1-85286-509-1
5	Mudd's Angels (short story collection)	J. A. Lawrence	April 14, 1994	1-85286-510-5
6	Trek to Madworld	Stephen Goldin	June 23, 1994	1-85286-530-X
7	Planet of Judgment	Joe Haldeman	August 11, 1994	1-85286-531-8
8	Devil World	Gordon Eklund	October 20, 1994	1-85286-532-6
9	The Fate of the Phoenix	Sondra Marshak and Myrna Culbreath	December 15, 1994	1-85286-535-0
10	Death's Angel	Kathleen Sky	February 16, 1995	1-85286-536-9
11	Vulcan!	Kathleen Sky	April 20, 1995	1-85286-537-7
12	World Without End	Joe Haldeman	June 22, 1995	1-85286-538-5

=== Classic Episodes (2016) ===
Star Trek: The Classic Episodes is an omnibus edition of the Blish and Lawrence novelizations. Published by Barnes & Noble in 2016 as part of the Collectible Editions series.

Title	Author(s)	Date	ISBN
The Classic Episodes	James Blish and J. A. Lawrence	April 29, 2016	978-0-385-36524-6

== See also ==
- List of Star Trek novels
- List of Star Trek reference books
- Star Trek Log
