= E. E. Smith bibliography =

List of works by E. E. Smith

This is a complete bibliography of works by the American space opera author E. E. Smith.

Since his death in 1965, the works of E.E. Smith are in the public domain in countries where the term of copyright lasts not more than 61 years after the death of the author; generally this does not include works first published posthumously. Works first published before 1927 are also in the public domain in the United States. Additionally, a number of the author's works have entered the public domain in the United States due to non-renewal of copyright.

== Bibliography ==
=== Series ===
==== Lensman ====
Note:

1. Triplanetary (revised version, Fantasy Press 1948, second chapter "The Fall of Atlantis" later republished as a short story, a.k.a. "Atlantis" in the 1951 anthology Journey to Infinity) Available online
2. First Lensman (Fantasy Press 1950) Available online
3. Galactic Patrol (Astounding Stories Sep 1937 – Feb 1938, Fantasy Press 1950)
4. Gray Lensman (Astounding Stories Oct 1939 – Jan 1940, Fantasy Press 1951)
5. Second Stage Lensmen (Astounding Stories Nov 1941 – Feb 1942, Fantasy Press 1953)
6. The Vortex Blaster, also known as Masters of the Vortex (simultaneously published by Fantasy Press and Gnome Press in 1960)
  - "The Vortex Blaster", Comet Stories (July 1941) Available online
  - "Storm Cloud on Deka", Astonishing Stories (June 1942)
  - "The Vortex Blaster Makes War", Astonishing Stories (Oct 1942)
7. Children of the Lens (Astounding Stories Nov 1947 – Feb 1948, Fantasy Press 1954)

==== Skylark ====
1. The Skylark of Space (written 1915–1920 with Mrs. Lee Hawkins Garby, Amazing Stories Aug–Oct 1928, Buffalo Book Co. 1946. Paperback edition, heavily revised and without the co-author credit, Pyramid Books 1958) Original version available online
2. Skylark Three (Amazing Stories Aug–Oct 1930, Fantasy Press 1948) Available online
3. Skylark of Valeron (Astounding Stories Aug 1934 – Feb 1935, Fantasy Press 1949)
4. Skylark DuQuesne (Worlds of If Jun–Oct 1965, Pyramid Books 1966)

==== Subspace ====
1. "Subspace Survivors" (novelette, Astounding July 1960) Available online
2. Subspace Explorers (Canaveral Press 1965, Ace 1968) – an expansion and revision of "Subspace Survivors"
3. Subspace Encounter (with Lloyd Arthur Eshbach, 1983)

(Subspace Safari was an unpublished novel completed by Smith in 1962 and intended as a direct sequel to "Subspace Survivors". After John W. Campbell rejected it (demanding major revisions), Smith reworked the material; parts became Subspace Explorers, while remaining elements contributed to the posthumous Subspace Encounter)

=== Non-series novels and collections ===
- Spacehounds of IPC (Amazing Stories Jul–Sep 1931, Fantasy Press 1947, Ace 1966) Available online
- Triplanetary (original magazine version, Amazing Stories Jan–Apr 1934) Available online
- The Galaxy Primes (Amazing Stories Mar–May 1959, Ace 1965. The latter a severely edited version Smith was very displeased with) Available online; The Galaxy Primes at Faded Page (Canada)
- The Best of E.E. "Doc" Smith (1975)
  - "To the Far Reaches of Space" (excerpt from The Skylark of Space, 1928)
  - "Robot Nemesis" (a.k.a. "What a Course!" and "Course Perilous!", Smith's contribution to the multi-authored series Cosmos, 1934)
  - "Pirates of Space" (excerpt from Triplanetary, 1934)
  - "The Vortex Blaster" (set in the Lensman universe, 1941)
  - "Tedric" (1953) Available online
  - "Lord Tedric" (1954) Available online
  - "Subspace Survivors" (1960)
  - "The Imperial Stars" (1964)
- Have Trenchcoat - Will Travel and Others: A Novel of Suspense and Three Short Stories (non-SF, Advent:Publishers 2001) ISBN 0-911682-33-3
  - Have Trenchcoat—Will Travel
  - "Motorsickle Cop"
  - "Nester of the Caramints"
  - "Full-Time Nurse"

=== Collaborations ===
- "What a Course!" (a.k.a. "Robot Nemesis", Chapter 13 (Part 14 of 18) of the round robin novel Cosmos, serialized in Science Fiction Digest/Fantasy Magazine July 1933-December 1934)
- "The Challenge From Beyond" (with Stanley G. Weinbaum, Donald Wandrei, Harl Vincent, and Murray Leinster, one of two round robin stories with the same name (one science fiction version and one fantasy version) published in Fantasy Magazine 1935)
- Masters of Space (Worlds of If November 1961 and January 1962, Orbit/Futura 1976) (unfinished work by sci-fi writer and former secretary of The Galactic Roamers fan club E. Everett Evans later revised and completed by Smith) Available online

=== Works by others based on Smith's fiction ===
The works below were published under Smith's name after his death.

==== Family D'Alembert ====
(by Stephen Goldin — the first novel is an expansion of Smith's novella of the same name)

1. Imperial Stars (1976)
2. Stranglers' Moon (1976)
3. The Clockwork Traitor (1976)
4. Getaway World (1977)
5. Appointment at Bloodstar, also known as The Bloodstar Conspiracy (1978)
6. The Purity Plot (1978)
7. Planet of Treachery (1981)
8. Eclipsing Binaries (1983)
9. The Omicron Invasion (1984)
10. Revolt of the Galaxy (1985)

==== Lord Tedric ====
(by Gordon Eklund based on an EES novella)

1. Lord Tedric (1978)
2. The Space Pirates (1979)
3. Black Knight of the Iron Sphere (1979)
4. Alien Realms (1980)

=== Non-fiction ===
- Some Clays of Idaho, (with Chester Fowler Smith) undergraduate thesis, University of Idaho, 1914.
- The effect of bleaching with oxides of nitrogen upon the baking quality and commercial value of wheat flour, PhD thesis, George Washington University, 1919, approximately 100 pp.
- "A study of some of the chemical changes which occur in oysters during their preparation for market", Bureau of Chemistry, U.S. Department of Agriculture Bulletin 740, 1919, 24 pp.
- "Viscosity and Baking Quality", Cereal Chemistry 2, 178–89, 1925.
- "What Science Fiction Means to Me" (Science Wonder Stories, June 1929)
- "Report of the Subcommittee on Hydrogen-Ion Concentration with Special Reference to the Effect of Flour Bleach", Cereal Chemistry 9, 424–8, 1932.
- "Catastrophe" (Astounding Science Fiction May 1938)
- Worldcon Guest of Honor Speech, originally presented at Chicon I on September 1, 1940. To be published in Worldcon Guest of Honor Speeches, edited by Mike Resnick and Joe Siclari, ISFiC Press, August 23, 2006.
- "The Epic of Space" in Of Worlds Beyond: The Science of Science Fiction Writing, edited by Lloyd Arthur Eshbach (Fantasy Press 1947; includes a biographical sketch)
- "What's Wrong With "Space-Opera"?", introduction to Man of Many Minds by E. Everett Evans (Fantasy Press 1953).
- "The People Who Make Other Worlds No. 11: Edward E. Smith" (Other Worlds Science Stories, March 1953)
- "The Origin of Life" (Luna No. 7 1969, Transcript of speech presented at 12th World Science Fiction Convention, California, Sept. 1954)
- "Review of the Reviewers" (Luna Magazine, 1962)
- "The Logic of the Law" (Trumpet #10, 1969)

=== Secondary sources ===
- Sean Barrett (2002) [1994]. GURPS Lensman. Steve Jackson Games. ISBN 1-55634-527-5. Contains a biographical sketch on p. 4, which is included in the excerpt at Steve Jackson Games.
- Ron Ellik; Bill Evans; Al Lewis (1966). The Universes of E. E. Smith. Advent. ISBN 0-911682-03-1.
- Ethan Fleischer Selectively Annotated English Primary Source Bibliography.
- Ethan Fleischer Z9M9Z: A Lensman Website
- Gharlane of Eddore (1998) Gharlane's Lensmen FAQ
- Robert A. Heinlein (1979). "Larger Than Life", written for MosCon I, published in Robert A. Heinlein (1980). Expanded Universe. Grosset & Dunlap. ISBN 0-448-11916-1.
- Edward E. Smith at the Internet Speculative Fiction Database.
- Stephen C. Lucchetti (2004). "Doc"—First Galactic Roamer: A Complete Bibliography…. NESFA Press. ISBN 1-886778-58-2.
- Sam Moskowitz (1942). "Doughnut Specialist Smith Blasts Vortices in His Spare Time", Astonishing Stories, June 1942, p. 6. Biographical note accompanying "Storm Cloud on Deka", which is inconsistent with other sources. Unsigned; attribution per Ellik, Evans, & Lewis p. 262.
- Sam Moskowitz (1964), "The Saga of 'Skylark' Smith" (Amazing Stories, April, 1964)
- Sam Moskowitz (1966). Seekers of Tomorrow. World Publishing. ISBN 0-88355-129-2.
- Frederik Pohl (1964). "Ode to a Skylark", If, May 1964. Reprinted in Lucchetti, pp. 11–15.
  - (2009) Doc "Skylark" Smith
- Alva Rogers (1964). A Requiem for Astounding. Advent. ISBN 0-911682-16-3.
- Joseph Sanders (1986). E. E. "Doc" Smith. Starmont House. ISBN 0-916732-73-8.
- Thomas Sheridan (1977). E. E. "Doc" Smith, Father of Star Wars. Necronomicon Press. 8pp. Reprint of an article in Fantasy Review, 1948. Describes itself as an interview, but is mostly an essay with some extended quotations.
- Verna Smith Trestrail (presumably 1979). MosCon I Keynote Speech, unpublished typewritten notes.
- Harry Warner (1938). Brief biography in Spaceways Volume 1, No. 1.
