= Wickström =

Wickström (in Swedish), Wickstrøm (in Norwegian) and Wickstrom (without diacritics) is a surname with a Scandinavic origin. Notable people with the surname include:

- André Wickström (born 1976), Finnish comedian and actor
- Brian Wickstrom (born 1969), American athletic director
- George Wickstrom and Bernie Wickstrom, father and son owners of The Zephyrhills News, a weekly broadsheet newspaper in Pasco County, Florida, U.S.A.
- James Wickstrom (1942–2018), American radio personality
- John Wickström (1870–1959), Finnish engineer and entrepreneur
- John Wickström (speed skater) (1927–1987), Swedish speed skater
- Jussi Wickström (born 1983), Finnish heavy metal guitarist
- Lois Wickstrom (born 1948), American writer
- Matt Wickstrom (born 1980), American Psychologist, Industrial-Organizational Psychologist and Nationally-Certified School Psychologist
- Pelle Wickstrom, a swimmer of the 4 × 200 m Freestyle Relay in the 1980 Summer Olympics
- Ragnar Wickström (1892–1959), Finnish footballer
- Rob Wickstrom, the husband of Mary Elizabeth McDonough, an American actress most famous for her role as "Erin Walton" in the series The Waltons
- Rolf Wickstrøm (1912–1941), Norwegian labour activist
- Steven N. Wickstrom (born 1958), United States Army general

== See also ==
- Vikström
- Wigström
- Wikström
