= Voyages of Imagination =

2006 reference work on Star Trek

- Print edition
- Author: Jeff Ayers
- Cover artist: Mark Gerber
- Language: English
- Genre: Encyclopedia
- Publisher: Pocket Books
- Publication date: November 14, 2006
- Publication place: United States
- Media type: Print (Paperback)
- Pages: 782
- ISBN: 1-4165-0349-8 (pb.); 1-4165-2548-3 (eBook)
- OCLC: 69485543
- Dewey Decimal: 813.0876
- LC Class: PS374.S35 A94 2006

Voyages of Imagination: The Star Trek Fiction Companion (2006) is a reference work by Jeff Ayers published by Pocket Books. The book contains entries on the production and publication of Star Trek tie-in novels published from 1967 to 2006. Included are brief synopses of plots for each featured novel.

== Production ==
Previous attempts to publish a reference or encyclopedia about Star Trek fiction had been refused by Pocket Books. According to Ayers, the reason was the contents of such a book would've focused on the characters and plots of each piece of fiction, and not the authors. Pocket Books editor Marco Palmieri noted that Voyages was "conceived as a guide to the history of professionally-published [Star Trek] fiction," and when completed the book would include information of fiction "from Mission to Horatius (1967) … through [to] Pocket's stewardship …"

Research for the book began sometime in 2004, including conducting interviews with authors who had written books many years prior such as Alan Dean Foster, J. A. Lawrence, and writing partners Sondra Marshak and Myrna Culbreath. Making contact with many of the past authors required assistance from others in the industry, whom Ayers cited in the book's acknowledgements.

A new revision of the Pocket Books Star Trek Timeline was to be included in Voyages. The timeline, which had previously appeared in the appendices of Adventures in Time and Space (1999) and What Lay Beyond (2001), required consultations with creators and other contributors to complete. Ayers referred to those who completed the revision as the "Timeliners".

Ayers also relied on a Star Trek book club who met regularly at the Barnes & Noble in Lynnwood, Washington, saying when he landed the assignment they "reinforced the idea that more people might buy the book than just my mother.”

Voyages was completed by Ayers in early 2006. The book was published in trade paperback format (ISBN 1-4165-0349-8) on November 14, 2006. An eBook edition (ISBN 1-4165-2548-3) was published on December 29, 2006.

== Contents ==
- Introduction: Star Trek Fiction: Then and Now. Ayers reminisces on the history of the tie-in fiction, from 1967 to the present (in 2006).
- Part I: Star Trek Fiction Published by Bantam Books: 1967–1981. The popular episode novelizations by James Blish, including the original novel Spock Must Die! (1970). Other works include the twelve novels, and details on the production of the anthologies, The New Voyages (1976) and The New Voyages 2 (1978). (Note: No books published by Bantam Books included The Original Series in the book title, or on title page, front or back matter, or the book cover.)
- Part II: Star Trek Fiction Published by Ballantine Books: 1974–1978. Summary of the Star Trek Log series based on Star Trek: The Animated Series with comments from author Alan Dean Foster. (Note: No books published by Ballantine Books included The Animated Series in the book title, or on title page, front or back matter, or the book cover.)
- Part III: Star Trek Fiction Published by Pocket Books: 1979–2006. The main body of the text.
  - Sections 1 and 2: Star Trek novels. (Note: Very few books published by Pocket Books include The Original Series in the book title, or on title page, front or back matter, or the book cover.)
  - Sections 3 and 4: Star Trek: The Next Generation novels.
  - Sections 5 and 6: Star Trek: Deep Space Nine novels
  - Sections 7 and 8: Star Trek: Voyager novels.
  - Section 9: Star Trek: Enterprise novels.
  - Section 10: Novelizations for Star Trek and The Next Generation films, and novelizations for episodes of The Next Generation, Deep Space Nine, Voyager, and Enterprise.
  - Section 11: "Original Fiction Concepts". Details on the series not based on a film or a television series, including: New Frontier, Starfleet Corps of Engineers, Stargazer, I.K.S. Gorkon, Titan, and Vanguard, and entries on other novels such as Starfleet: Year One (2002).
  - Section 12: "Miniseries". Information on various crossover series, such as Invasion!, Day of Honor, Double Helix, and Section 31.
  - Section 13: "Anthologies". Overview of the Strange New Worlds anthology series, and other such as The Lives of Dax (1999).
  - Section 14: "Other Star Trek Fiction". A short section on unique works, such as Captain Proton: Defender of Earth (1999), and the in-universe travelogue New Worlds, New Civilizations (1999).
  - Section 15: "Young Adult Fiction". Overview of the Starfleet Academy crossover series with entries based on characters from the first four televisions series.
- Star Trek Fiction Timeline. (Note: The Pocket Books Star Trek Timeline was created by David Bowling, Johan Ciamaglia, Ryan J. Cornelius, James R. McCain, Alex Rosenzweig, Paul T. Semones, and Corey W. Tacker. Third revision compiled in collaboration with Jason Barney, David Henderson, Lee Jamilkowski, and Geoff Trowbridge. With special thanks to Keith R. A. DeCandido, James e. Goeders, Robert Greenberger, Bob Manojlovich, John J. Ordover, Bill Williams and David Young.) The third version of the timeline previously published in Adventures In Time and Space (1999) and What Lay Beyond (2001). The ebook version of the timeline makes use of extensive hypertext footnotes.

== Reception ==
Marco Palmieri said "as an experienced researcher and devoted reader," Ayers had "the right qualifications for such a colossal undertaking." Jacqueline Bundy of TrekToday also complimented Ayer's bibliographic experience, as well as his understanding of what information to include to make Voyages "an excellent reference title." Ayers has taken an additional step, she explained, to provide "glimpses into the thought processes behind the creation of the fiction."

Jeff Shannon of The Seattle Times offered the following: "The result is a tome the size of a big-city phone book, providing not just an exhaustive guide to Star Trek fiction but also a revealing glimpse into the publishing industry that surrounds it …" He concluded that Voyages takes care to show the "gifted prose stylists, and editors responsible for ensuring that Star Trek fiction isn’t sucked into a worm-hole of historical contradictions."

Some fans questioned why author's notes were not included for books, such as those by Judith and Garfield Reeves-Stevens. Greg Cox replied that "there are as many different answers as there are authors" who were not included.

A character in Hide Your Fear (2017), by Kevin O'Brien, returned a copy of Voyages of Imagination to a public library seven days overdue, earning a fine of $3.50. The narrator comments on the character's conscientiousness as a library patron.

== See also ==
- List of Star Trek novels
- Star Trek (Bantam Books)
- Star Trek Log (book series)
