= Vulcan! =

1978 novel by Kathleen Sky

- Author: Kathleen Sky
- Cover artist: Bob Larkin
- Language: English
- Subject: Star Trek
- Genre: Science fiction
- Publisher: Bantam Books
- Publication date: September 1978
- Publication place: United States
- Media type: Print (Paperback)
- Pages: 175
- ISBN: 0-553-12137-5
- Preceded by: Planet of Judgment
- Followed by: The Starless World

Vulcan! (1978) is a science fiction novel by American writer Kathleen Sky, a tie-in of Star Trek: The Original Series. The book is an adaptation of an unproduced spec script by Sky.

== Production ==
Kathleen Sky submitted a spec script to the producers Star Trek during the production the show's third season. She was informed the script might be produced the following season. However, the series was cancelled late in the third season's production.

Editors at Bantam Books recruited Sky to contribute a Star Trek tie-in novel sometime after 1976. She opted to adapt her unproduced script. David Gerrold, the writer of the episode "The Trouble with Tribbles", wrote a foreword to the novel. Sky's husband, Stephen Goldin, also wrote the tie-in novel Trek to Madworld, also published by Bantam.

As of 2008, a first edition copy of Vulcan! was valued up to US$22.

== Plot summary ==
Ion storms have caused the boundaries of the Neutral Zone between the Federation and Romulans to shift. The planet Arachne IV, inhabited by a strange ant-like race, could be lost to the Federation due to the changes in space. However, Mr. Spock goes on a death-defying assignment into a war of ant-like creatures along with a scientist who dislikes Vulcans.

== Reception ==
A bibliographic note in the December 1979 edition of Science Fiction and Fantasy Book Review explained that "Sky ascribes more emotion to Spock than is logical under the circumstances [of the plot]".
