= Jesco von Puttkamer =

German-American aerospace engineer and writer

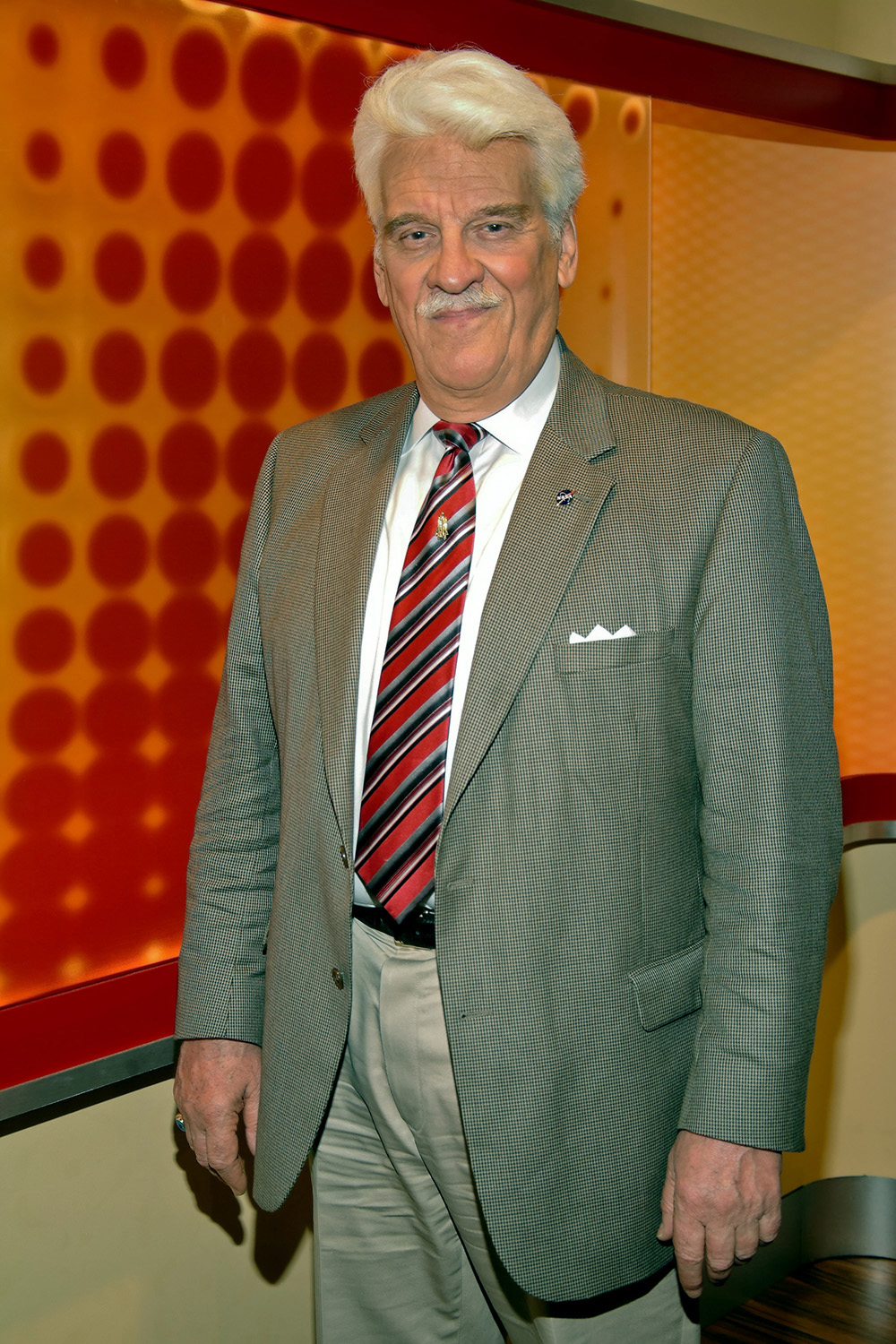
- Jesco von Puttkamer at ZDF (2009)
- Born: Jesco Hans Heinrich Max Freiherr von Puttkamer; 22 September 1933; Leipzig, Germany
- Died: 27 December 2012 (aged 79); Alexandria, Virginia, United States
- Citizenship: American (1967), German
- Education: RWTH Aachen University
- Occupation: Aerospace engineer
- Years active: 1956–2012
- Employer: NASA

Jesco Hans Heinrich Max Freiherr von Puttkamer (22 September 1933 – 27 December 2012) was a German-American aerospace engineer, senior manager at NASA, and a pulp science fiction writer.

He was an advocate of human space exploration, and the search for extraterrestrial intelligence (SETI). While at NASA, he served as the program manager in charge of long-range planning of deep space crewed activities (flights beyond Earth orbit). He was regarded as an expert on the Russian space program.

Puttkamer assisted with daily on-orbit operations at NASA from 2009 until 2012.

He was given the nickname Jessie by DeForest Kelley, whom Puttkammer called Dee.

He died of a sudden flu-like illness on 27 December 2012.

== Early life ==
He was born, in Leipzig, to the German noble Puttkamer family with the titular rank of baron (Freiherr). According to family tradition, each firstborn Puttkamer son is given the forename Jesco.

Puttkamer finished high school in Konstanz, and studied mechanical engineering at the Technische Hochschule (RWTH Aachen University) in Aachen.

== Career ==
In 1962, Puttkamer left West Germany for the United States, where he was recruited into Wernher von Braun's rocket team at the NASA Marshall Space Flight Center in Huntsville, Alabama. He was a senior engineer on the Apollo program. His supervisor at Marshall was Ernst Geissler.

He was granted United States citizenship in 1967.

Puttkammer was a consultant and technical advisor for Star Trek: The Motion Picture (1979), contributing the hypothetical theory behind the faster-than-light space warp drive, and the wormhole effect featured in the film.

From 1985 to 2000, he lectured at FH Aachen as an Honorary Professor. In 1995, Puttkamer was awarded an honorary Doctorate in Philosophy by Saarland University for his pioneering contributions to the understanding of space flight. He was a frequent consultant to President George W. Bush during the implementation of the president's Vision for Space Exploration.

Puttkamer said that among his most treasured achievements at NASA were: his contributions to the Apollo program; the lunar landing in 1969, which fulfilled President John F. Kennedy's mandate; and recovering America's experimental space station Skylab after its disastrous launch into orbit on 14 May 1973. He often spoke of "rescuing" the backup Skylab from being scrapped, so it could be publicly displayed in the National Air and Space Museum in Washington, D.C.

An interview of Puttkamer by Jörg Weigand was published in Perry Rhodan, Issue 2302. He was a guest on ZDF's Nachtstudio in 2009. The episode, hosted by Volker Panzer, titled "Moonstruck", was a retrospective on German contributions to space exploration, and focused heavily on the Apollo Moon landing.

== Writing ==
Puttkamer was the author of more than a dozen books on space flight. He also wrote many science fiction short stories which were published by West German pulp magazines, notably Pabel's Utopia Sonderband (with volume #3 renamed to Utopia SF Magazin) (1956–57) and Moewig's Terra and Terra Astra (1960–61). His stories have been reprinted frequently since. He also published several serialized essays from 1964 to 1969 for a number of West German magazines.

His stories, originally published in Utopia SF Magazin, were collected in Elektronengehirne, Wurmlöcher und Weltmodelle (December 1985) along with six new stories. The collection was released as part of the Utopia Classics series. The story "The Sleeping God" was collected in the anthology Star Trek: The New Voyages 2, along with an introduction by Puttkamer where he explains science fiction, like Star Trek, humanizes space, making it "more understandable for the young in mind."

His German-language memoir and essay of the Apollo 11 lunar landing, "Apollo 11: Ausflug in die Mondwelt," was reissued in a Chinese translation in 1982, in Beijing. A revised edition of the essay was included in his book, Abenteuer Apollo 11, released on the 40th anniversary of the Apollo 11 mission.

== Awards and honors ==
- Puttkamer was awarded with numerous accolades while at NASA, among them the Exceptional Service Medal (2004), for outstanding services by a civilian, followed by the NASA Honor Award, for advancing American-Russian cooperation in space flight, in 2007.
- In December 2008, Puttkamer was honored with the "Distinguished German-American of the Year" award by the German-American Heritage Foundation of the USA (GAHF).
- Asteroid 266725 Vonputtkamer, discovered by Matthias Busch and Rainer Kresken at the ESA Optical Ground Station in 2009, was named in his honor. The official naming citation was published by the Minor Planet Center on 12 October 2011 (M.P.C. 76677).

== Bibliography ==
The following bibliography is incomplete:

=== Novels and novellas ===
- Der Unheimliche vom anderen Stern (June 1958), Pabel. Originally published by Dörnersche Verlagsgesellschaft (1957).
- Die Reise des schlafenden Gottes (19 February 1960), Terra Sonderband #25 (Moewig).
- Welt ohne Menschen (10 May 1960), with Bogislav von Puttkamer, Utopia future novella #225 (Pabel).
- Das unsterbliche Universum (24 June 1960), with Clark Darlton, Terra Astra #123 (Moewig). Originally published by Belowa (1959).
- Galaxis ahoi! (12 August 1960), Terra #131 (Moewig). Originally published by Dörnersche Verlagsgesellschaft (1959).
- Das Zeit-Manuskript (15 September 1961), Terra #191 (Moewig). Originally published by Balowa (1960).
- Die sechste Phase (27 October 1961), Terra #197 (Moewig). Originally published by Belowa (1961).
- Elektronengehirne, Wurmlöcher und Weltmodelle (December 1985), Jesco von Puttkamer, Utopia Classics #84 (Moewig) ISBN 3-8118-5030-X.

=== Short fiction ===
- "Der integrierende Faktor" (1956) Utopia Sonderband #2 (Pabel).
- "Zu jung für die Ewigkeit" (1956) Utopia Science Fiction Magazin #3 (Pabel).
- "Wer zuletzt lacht" (1956), Utopia Science Fiction Magazin #4 (Pabel).
- "Heldentod" (September 1956) Utopia Science Fiction Magazin #9 (Pabel).
- "The Sleeping God," Star Trek: The New Voyages 2 (January 1978), Sondra Marshak and Myrna Culbreath, eds., Bantam Books ISBN 0-553-11392-5.
- "Am Ende der Zukunft," Beteigeuze (June 1981), Thomas Le Blanc, ed., Goldmann SF #23385 (Goldmann) ISBN 3-442-23385-2.
- "Danke für den Tip!," Science Fiction Almanach 1983 (December 1982), H. J. Alpers, ed., Moewig SF #3603 (Moewig) ISBN 3-8118-3603-X.
- "Bestimmung," Elektronengehirne, Wurmlöcher und Weltmodelle (December 1985), Jesco von Puttkamer, ed., Utopia Classics #84 [Moewig) ISBN 3-8118-5030-X.
- "Danke für den Tip," Elektronengehirne, Wurmlöcher und Weltmodelle (December 1985), Jesco von Puttkamer, ed., Utopia Classics #84 (Moewig) ISBN 3-8118-5030-X.
- "Der Super-Zweikampf," Elektronengehirne, Wurmlöcher und Weltmodelle (December 1985), Jesco von Puttkamer, ed., Utopia Classics #84 (Moewig) ISBN 3-8118-5030-X.
- "Hausieren verboten," Elektronengehirne, Wurmlöcher und Weltmodelle (December 1985), Jesco von Puttkamer, ed., Utopia Classics #84 (Moewig) ISBN 3-8118-5030-X.
- "Selbst ist der Mann," Elektronengehirne, Wurmlöcher und Weltmodelle (December 1985), Jesco von Puttkamer, ed., Utopia Classics #84 (Moewig) ISBN 3-8118-5030-X.
- "Simultanzeit," Elektronengehirne, Wurmlöcher und Weltmodelle (December 1985), Jesco von Puttkamer, ed., Utopia Classics #84 (Moewig) ISBN 3-8118-5030-X.

=== Nonfiction ===
- Apollo 8, Aufbruch ins All (1969), Heyne (Heyne Sachbuch #130).
- Jahrtausendprojekt Mars: Chance und Schicksal der Menschheit (1996), Langen-Müller ISBN 3-7844-2571-2.
- Abenteuer Apollo 11: von der Mondlandung zur Erkundung des Mars (22 June 2009), Herbig ISBN 978-3-7766-2616-2.

== See also ==
- NASA
- Vision for Space Exploration
- German-American Heritage Foundation of the USA
