= Star Trek Lives! =

- First printing (1975)
- Authors: Jacqueline Lichtenberg, Sondra Marshak and Joan Winston
- Cover artist: Lou Feck, Mitchell Hooks
- Language: English
- Subject: Star Trek fandom
- Publisher: Bantam Books Y2151
- Publication date: July 1975
- Publication place: United States
- Media type: Print (Paperback)
- Pages: 274
- OCLC: 780195418
- Dewey Decimal: 791.457
- LC Class: PN1992.77.S73 L5
- First edition/printing was not assigned an ISBN.

Star Trek Lives! is a 1975 book, co-written by Jacqueline Lichtenberg, Sondra Marshak, and Joan Winston, which explored the relationship between the Star Trek television series and the fandom that emerged following the series' cancellation. It was published by Bantam Books.

The book is among the earliest publications to discuss Star Trek convention culture, fan clubs, and fanzines. The ninth chapter contains an essay by Lichtenberg and Marshak on fan fiction inspired by Star Trek.

== Production ==
Jacqueline Lichtenberg, a professionally published author whose Kraith fan fiction was regularly published by fanzines, explored the possibility of selling an article, or series of articles, to newspapers concerning the growing Star Trek fandom. She began research in late 1971. While building a directory of Star Trek fan clubs, their activities, and the growing number of fan published newsletters, and fanzines, she realized there was more potential for a reference book on the subject than a newspaper article.

Science fiction fanzines had been published with some frequency prior to Star Trek; however, their format was focused on non-fiction articles and research, and letters from fans. Early Star Trek fanzines were similar, but many were also anthologizing fan fiction, some of which Lichtenberg believed was comparable to the television series.

A query package was assembled by Lichtenberg, and shared with publishers. However, the query was rejected by all, including by Frederick Pohl at Bantam Books, who were publishing a series of episode novelizations by James Blish. Pohl had also published Blish's original Star Trek novel, Spock Must Die! (1970). Only after Blish had failed to meet a deadline to deliver a new Star Trek novel did Pohl agree to buy Lichtenberg's proposed book without having seen a draft. Lichtenberg then recruited fellow fan writer Sondra Marshak, and television producer Joan Winston, to help draft the book. Gene Roddenberry, a friend of Lichtenberg and Winston's, agreed to contribute an introduction. Myrna Culbreath, a mutual friend of Lichtenberg and Marshak's, contributed to some degree, and her fan-published analysis on the Spock character, "The Spock Premise," was cited in the acknowledgements.

According to Lichtenberg, the book took several years to complete. The final draft, delivered to Pohl, had undergone significant changes from the original premise, so the authors were unable to agree on a title. Star Trek Lives!, and the subtitle "Personal Notes and Anecdotes," were chosen by Pohl. Plans to include a comprehensive directory of fan clubs, fanzines, and selections of curated fan fiction were withdrawn due to length. The plans to publish a curated selection of fan-written fiction evolved into The New Voyages series, edited by Marshak and Culbreath.

The book was published in July 1975 by Bantam Books in the U.S. and Corgi in the U.K. Star Trek Lives! was a bestseller, and received eight printings between 1975 and 1979.

== Contents ==
- Foreword by Gene Roddenberry
- Introduction by the authors.
- Chapter 1 – The Discovery Effect: An essay on the seductive draw of the new and refreshing stories presented by the television series.
- Chapter 2 – The Tailored Effect: Lichtenberg studies the various "tailored" effects, such as characters, plotting, and settings, that resulted in the mass-appeal of the series.
- Chapter 3 – I Should Never Have Answered The Phone: Joan Winston reminisces on the role she played during the production of the first Star Trek convention which opened on 21 January 1972.
- Chapter 4 – The Spock Charisma Effect: An essay on the popularity of the half-human, half-alien, first officer of the Enterprise. The writers argue the reason for the character's popularity is the viewers are given far more opportunities to learn about Spock's personality and personal history, than other characters, including Captain Kirk. Spock is described as having sex appeal.
- Chapter 5 – The Optimism Effect: Lichtenberg and Marshak discuss "vision of a brighter future of man, and of a world characterized by hope, achievement and understanding." They argue such a positive, forward-thinking premise resulted in viewers taking on such an aspiration as a guide for their own personal successes.
- Chapter 6 – The Goal Effect: An essay exploring the idea "that important goals are worthwhile, worth striving for and -- attainable." The attainment of co-operation between civilizations within the Star Trek universe being an allusion to the cooperation among the nations and people of Earth.
- Chapter 7 – Beauty May Be Only Skin Deep, But Chopped Liver Can Get You Anywhere Or Six Glorious Days On The Star Trek Set: Winston reminisces on her visit to Desilu, in Culver City, during the filming of "Turnabout Intruder"—the final episode of the series.
- Chapter 8 – What Are They Doing Now?: Interviews with former cast members and producers of the televisions series, includes details on their future projects.
- Chapter 9 – Do-It-Yourself Star Trek, The Fan Fiction: Marshak and Lichtenberg explain what fan fiction is, its place in the fandom, and offer some advice to the reader on how to write it. One of the questions explored in the essay is why so many Star Trek fan fiction writers are women.

== Reception ==
According to Lichtenberg, the initial reaction among fans was mixed as "they were expecting a history of the fandom." One fan wrote a scathing review in a letter to The Halkan Council (1975), saying they felt cheated since "I would much rather have [read] an analysis of the fans of Star Trek … than of the show itself." Lichtenberg agreed with the reviewer's feelings that many fans felt a true anthropological study of "the fandom [was] rare and invaluable" In subsequent interviews, she admitted that "Star Trek Lives! was not perfect."

Other fans reflected differently on the book. Sue Bursztynski wrote in her review of Harry, A History (2008) that Star Trek Lives! "let me know that this sort of thing was going on, and what kind of activities fans got up to." Patricia Poole said in Fic: Why Fanfiction is Taking Over The World (2014) she was "stunned" to find things she had written "transformed into pages in a real book." Poole had previously corresponded with Lichtenberg on what became known as "the discovery effect." Poole said she was inspired by her experiences at a Detroit-area Star Trek convention.

Gary McGath wrote in an issue of the MIT student-run editorial Ergo (1975) that Star Trek was far from the perfect "romantic drama," but Star Trek Lives! "does the best job thus far of showing just what the series accomplishes." Likewise, Winston Howlett wrote in an issue of fanzine Probe that readers should not be deterred from "picking up and reading this very well-written[,] and very entertaining book." And that it belongs on every fan's shelf, "for it makes up a large, healthy chunk of the [Star Trek] saga, telling where we've been, where we are now, and where we hope to be going."

Lichtenberg, Marshak and Winston, were named the "foremothers of fanfiction scholarship" by Francesca Coppa in The Fanfiction Reader (2017), due to their work on Star Trek Lives!, and the catalyzing effect the book had on fan scholarship. Edward Gross and Mark A. Altman lauded Star Trek Lives! as a "seminal" work in the first volume of The Fifty Year Mission (2016). In her fandom history Boldly Writing (2003), J. M. Verba credited Star Trek Lives! for increasing "fanzine recognition far beyond the wildest dreams of any editor."

== See also ==
- Trekkie
- Fanzine
- Fan fiction
- Kirk/Spock
- Star Trek (Bantam Books)
