= The Vulcan Academy Murders =

1984 novel by Jean Lorrah

- Cover
- Author: Jean Lorrah
- Language: English
- Genre: Science fiction
- Publisher: Pocket Books
- Publication date: November 1984
- Publication place: United States
- Media type: Print (paperback)
- Pages: 278
- ISBN: 0-671-72367-7 (first edition, paperback)
- Preceded by: The Tears of the Singers
- Followed by: Uhura's Song

The Vulcan Academy Murders is a science fiction novel by American writer Jean Lorrah, part of the Star Trek: The Original Series franchise.

== Plot ==
Captain Kirk and Dr. McCoy travel to a hospital facility on Vulcan to acquire treatment for a badly wounded Enterprise crew member. Kirk encounters Spock's mother, Amanda Grayson, and Spock's father, Sarek, and soon becomes heavily involved in Spock's personal life.

Then people begin to die. Kirk, trying to solve the case, is hampered by some Vulcans' belief that it would be illogical for murder to be happening on their home world, and that the deaths are therefore accidents. But he knows criminal behavior when he sees it, and presses on.

== Production ==
Lorrah decided to write a script for Star Trek: The Original Series after seeing the first episode, but found that she couldn't due to issues with Hollywood agents. She decided afterwards to write a Star Trek novel, but shelved the idea at first as Pocket Books were only accepting submissions from published authors at the time. After she published First Channel and Savage Empire, she decided to give a Star Trek novel, describing the story as one that "grew out of my fannish stories in the Night of the Twin Moons universe." She wrote a sequel which was published in February 1988. Entitled The IDIC Epidemic, she described it as another story taken from the universe of her other novels.

== Reception ==
The Vulcan Academy Murders reached 12th place in the New York Times Bestsellers list in November 1984. Jordan Hoffman read the book as a test case as to see whether or not he should read and review the non-canonical Star Trek novels for his blog. He got halfway through the book before discarding it, calling it a "waste of my fucking time!" Lisa Evans, while writing for the Daily Kos blog, described the novel as "not only is mediocre Trek but a mediocre mystery".
