= World Without End (Haldeman novel) =

1979 novel by Joe Haldeman

- Cover
- Author: Joe Haldeman
- Cover artist: Eddie Jones
- Language: English
- Series: Star Trek
- Genre: Science fiction
- Publisher: Bantam Books
- Publication date: February 1979
- Publication place: United States
- Media type: Print (Paperback)
- Pages: 150
- ISBN: 0-553-12583-4
- OCLC: 655834196
- Preceded by: Trek to Madworld
- Followed by: The Fate of the Phoenix

World Without End is a science fiction novel by American writer Joe Haldeman, a tie-in of Star Trek TV series. It was published by Bantam Books in February 1979.

== Plot ==
Captain Kirk and a landing party of four have gone aboard an alien starship/planetoid. They are in prison, awaiting questioning.

Commander Spock is in command, but is unable to do much. Mysterious tentacles have ensnared the ship, draining power. Spock finds himself with few options, remaining on board and eventually crashing to the planetoid surface or beaming inside to join the Captain.
