= Wärtsilä Vasa =

Engine series (1977–2010)

Wärtsilä Vasa is an engine series built by Finnish diesel engine manufacturer Wärtsilä. It was released in 1977 and remained in production until 2010. These medium speed diesels were produced in and named after Vasa, Finland. The lead designer of the first engine was Wilmer Wahlstedt. The series comprises three models, the Vasa 22, 32, and 46, with the number denoting the bore size of the engine.

Wärtsilä discontinued production of the series in 2010 to focus on newer technology. The Vasa series acted as a precursor to the newer 32 D and E series which have a higher power output.

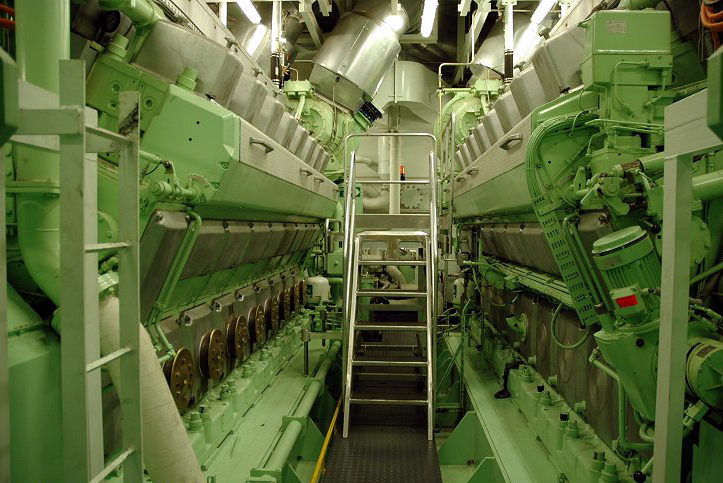
Two Vasa 32 engines used in a ship's engine room.

== Models ==
- Vasa 14
- W16
- Wartsila Vasa 20
- Wärtsilä Vasa 22
- Vasa 24
- Wartsila Vasa 26
- Wärtsilä Vasa 32
- Wärtsilä Vasa 46

=== Technical data ===
The engines were designed for both shipboard and power plant applications. The engine could be ordered with a 220, 320, and 460 mm bore in both V and inline configurations. The inline style was available with up to 9 cylinders and V could support up to 18. The VASA32LN engine was redesigned with a longer stroke to increase horsepower.

Vasa engines are turbocharged, non-reversible, and utilize a direct fuel injection system. They were designed to continuously run on heavy fuel oil (HFO), provided that the fuel is pre-heated and at the correct viscosity at the time of injection.

Model	375 kW/cyl	bhp	410 kW/cyl	bhp
4R32LN	1500	2040	1640	2230
6R32LN	2250	3060	2460	3340
8R32LN	3000	4080	3280	4460
9R32LN	3375	4590	3690	5020
12V32LN	4500	6120	4920	6690
16V32LN	6000	8160	6560	8920
18V32LN	6750	9170	7380	10030

This is the power rating table generated for the Vasa 32LN engine. Engine power ratings are determined by how the engine is being used. The Vasa engines offer 375 kW/cyl and 410 kW/cyl. As the number of cylinders increase, the power increases. The size of the engine depends on the application it is being used for.

==== Lubrication ====
Vasa engines utilize a circulating oil system for lubrication, complete with a main, pre-lubricating pump, and an oil cooler. Smaller Vasa engines use gear type pumps for lubrication where the larger engines use wheel type pumps.

==== Starting mechanism ====
Air is utilized to start the engines. Each cylinder head is equipped with a start air valve that delivers high-pressure air to the cylinder upon startup. This provides the engine the initial rotation force needed to achieve combustion.

==== Fresh water cooling ====
Treated fresh water is used for cooling of the cylinder, charge air, turbocharger, and oil. Freshwater cooling is divided into two systems the HT (High Temperature) cooling the cylinders and turbocharger and the LT (Low Temperature) cooling the oil and charge air. The freshwater temperature is closely regulated with a thermostatic valve to achieve optimum efficiency. At low engine loads, the charge can be too cold, which can cause incomplete combustion. To counteract this heat rejected to the lubrication oil can be used to heat the freshwater, which in turn heats the charge air enough to ensure complete combustion.

==== Control systems ====
Vasa engines can start remotely away from the engine or manually by manipulating the valves on the start air system. Upon startup engine speed is controlled by a governor, which mechanically adjusts fuel delivery to match the load demanded of the engine.

Conditions are also in place to protect the engine. During operation, an engine will automatically cease injection if all preset conditions are not met.

=== Applications ===
These engines are primarily used for power generation and diesel-electric propulsion plants. Since they are non-reversible, they are not widely used as propulsion engines. The engines were used to provide electrical power for both propulsion and auxiliary services. Due to their ability to run on heavy fuel oil (HFO) or MDO (Marine Diesel Oil), many ships were equipped with the Vasa series engines.

In the power generation industry, these engines are used as auxiliary generators or as backup power generators.

== See also ==
- Wickström
