= Protostar (disambiguation) =

A protostar is a very young star that is still gathering mass from its parent molecular cloud.

Protostar(s) may also refer to:

- ProtoStar, a short-lived satellite company (2006–2009)
- Protostar (EP), a 2020 EP by JO1
- Protostar: War on the Frontier, a 1993 science fiction video game
- Protostars (book), a 1971 science fiction anthology
- USS Protostar, a fictional Starfleet ship from the science fiction series Star Trek: Prodigy
- Kyle Fletcher, an Australian professional wrestler for All Elite Wrestling who uses "The Protostar" as a nickname
