= Mutiny on the Enterprise =

1983 novel by Robert E. Vardeman

- Cover
- Author: Robert E. Vardeman
- Language: English
- Series: Star Trek: The Original Series
- Genre: Science fiction
- Publisher: Pocket Books
- Publication date: October 1983
- Publication place: United States
- Media type: Print (Paperback)
- Pages: 189
- ISBN: 0-671-70800-7 (first edition, paperback)
- OCLC: 25312095
- Preceded by: Yesterday's Son
- Followed by: The Wounded Sky

Mutiny on the Enterprise is a science fiction novel by American writer Robert E. Vardeman, part of the Star Trek: The Original Series franchise.

== Plot ==
A much needed peace mission to the Orion Arm is delayed when the Enterprise becomes damaged while in orbit around a living planet. Further problems arise when a mysterious female guest causes much of the crew to become hardline pacifists — ruining the real mission. Kirk must now lead the rebellion against his own crew.
