= Joan Winston =

Joan Winston (19 June 1931 – 11 September 2008) was an American Trekker who helped organize the first Star Trek fan convention and became a key figure in the subculture.

== Life and career ==
Fellow fans compare her level of devotion to Betty Jo Trimble, the fan who led the campaign to keep Star Trek on the air. Winston attended the filming of what would be the final episode and impressed everyone on set, including creator Gene Roddenberry. Winston was able to secure Roddenberry's attendance at the first convention, and she also arranged for tapes of 15 episodes, a blooper reel, and a truck of space memorabilia from NASA. After helping to coordinate the first four conventions, Winston became a sought-after guest in her own right at the many rival conventions that popped up. She wrote Star Trek Lives! in 1975 with Jacqueline Lichtenberg and Sondra Marshak and The Making of the Trek Conventions in 1977, as well as numerous fan publications for the original and subsequent series.

Winston died of Alzheimer's disease in Manhattan.
