= Kathleen Sky =

American novelist

- Born: August 5, 1943 (age 83); Alhambra, California, U.S.
- Occupation: Writer
- Writing career
- Genre: Speculative fiction

Kathleen Sky (born Kathleen McKinney, August 5, 1943) is the pen name of Kathleen McKinney Goldin, an American science fiction and fantasy author. Her pen name is her former married name from her marriage to first husband Karl Sky. From 1972 to 1982 she was married to fellow author and collaborator Stephen Goldin.

Most of her fiction is romantic in nature. Her books include Vulcan! and Death's Angel, two of the earliest original novels based on the 1960s Star Trek TV series.

== Bibliography ==
=== Star Trek novels ===
- Vulcan! reissued as Star Trek Adventures 11: Vulcan! (Bantam Books, September 1978, ISBN 0-553-12137-5; Titan Books reissue, April 20, 1995, ISBN 1-85286-537-7; Spectra October 6, 1998, ISBN 0-553-24633-X)
- Death's Angel reissued as Star Trek Adventures 10: Death's Angel (Bantam Books, April 1981, ISBN 0-553-24983-5; Titan Books reissue, February 15, 1994, ISBN 1-85286-536-9; Spectra reissue, May 1, 1995, ISBN 0-553-24983-5)

=== Other novels ===
- Birthright (1975)
- Ice Prison (1976)
- Witchdame (1984)

=== Collections ===
- Star Rooks (ebook) (Embiid Publishing, January 2004, ISBN 1-58787-252-8) (with Stephen Goldin)

=== Short stories ===
- "One Ordinary Day, with Box" (1972)
- "Lament of the Keeku Bird" (1973)
- "Door to Malequar" (1975)
- "A Daisychain for Pav" (1976)
- "Motherbeast" (1978)
- "The Devil Behind the Leaves" (1981) (with Stephen Goldin)
- "But I Don't Do Dragons" (1982)
- "Painting the Roses Red" (2004) (with Stephen Goldin)

=== Nonfiction ===
- "Sauerbraten" (1973)
- An Hour with Kathleen Sky (cassette audiobook) (1979) (with Stephen Goldin)
- The Business of Being a Writer (1982) (with Stephen Goldin)
