= Star Trek: The New Voyages 2 =

- First printing (Jan 1978)
- Editor: Sondra Marshak and Myrna Culbreath
- Cover artist: Eddie Jones
- Language: English
- Series: Star Trek
- Publisher: Bantam Books
- Publication date: January 1978
- Publication place: United States
- Pages: 252
- ISBN: 0-553-11392-5
- Preceded by: Star Trek: The New Voyages

Star Trek: The New Voyages 2 (1978) is an anthology of short fiction based on Star Trek, edited by Sondra Marshak and Myrna Culbreath. The anthology is follow-up to Star Trek: The New Voyages (1976). Jesco von Puttkamer wrote in the anthology's introduction that science fiction, such as Star Trek, humanizes space, making it "more understandable for the young in mind."

The editors credit the quality of stories previously published in Star Trek fanzines for the success of the first volume, The New Voyages. Their goal for the second volume was to include more unpublished stories. However, four of the included stories were previously published in fanzines.

The cover artist for the first printing is not identified in the book matter, but was identified as Eddie Jones in Space Wars: Worlds and Weapons (1979).

Marshak and Culbreath co-wrote and released the original novel The Price of the Phoenix prior to completing work on the anthology.

== Contents ==
Stories and poems are prefaced by introductions from the editors.

- Preface: "The Once and Future Voyages 2 -- The Camelot Connection", by Sondra Marshak and Myrna Culbreath.
- Introduction, by Jesco von Puttkamer.
- "Surprise!" by Nichelle Nichols, Sondra Marshak and Myrna Culbreath. Captain Kirk's birthday celebration is disrupted by an energy creature found on board the Enterprise.
- "Snake Pit!" by Connie Faddis. (Originally published in Universal Transmitter 1.) The Enterprise intervenes in a conflict between the Hualans and a Federation starbase.
- "The Patient Parasites", teleplay by Russell Bates. A landing party is held hostage by a deranged robot probe.
- "In the Maze", by Jennifer Guttridge. (Originally published in T-Negative 23.) The crew are studied and experimented upon by extra-dimensional beings.
- "Cave-In", poem by Jane Peyton. (Originally published in Spockanalia 5.)
- "Marginal Existence", by Connie Faddis. (Originally published in T-Negative 11.) A landing party discovers an ancient city populated by some kind of sleeping humanoids.
- "The Procrustean Petard", by Sondra Marshak and Myrna Culbreath. The genders of the Enterprise crew are reversed.
- "The Sleeping God", by Jesco von Puttkamer. Enterprise investigates attacks on inhabited worlds by an unknown, planet-sized, computer. They receive help from an equally unknown, but powerful, telepath.
- "Elegy For Charlie", poem by Antonia Vallario.
- Postscript: "Gentlepersons — The Vulcan Connection", essay by Marguerite B. Thompson.
- "Soliloquy", poem by Marguerite B. Thompson.

== Sequels ==
Additional volumes were planned, but they were never realized. Some time after The New Voyages 2 was released, the license for Star Trek tie-in fiction was awarded to Pocket Books. From 1981 onward, Pocket released a new line of books based on Star Trek, and did not continue any of the lines created by Bantam, including The New Voyages series.

Pocket Books launched the Strange New Worlds book line, edited by Dean Wesley Smith, in 1998.
