= The War of Powers =

Series of six epic fantasy fiction novels

The War of Powers is a series of six epic fantasy fiction novels, co-written by American authors Robert E. Vardeman and Victor Milán. The books were first published from 1980 to 1982.

== Novels ==
The books were originally published as series of six novels, from 1980 to 1982:

- The Sundered Realm
- The City in the Glacier
- The Destiny Stone
- The Fallen Ones
- In the Shadow of Omizantrim
- Demon of the Dark Ones

Later, the novels were regrouped to form two trilogies, each sold as a single volume: the first three packaged as The War of Powers part 1, and the last three forming The War of Powers part 2: Istu Awakened.

== Plot summaries ==
Set in the fantasy world of The Sundered Realm, the story concerns itself with the adventures of Fost Longstrider, a hard living warrior who makes a living as a courier and Princess Moriana Etuul, heir to the throne of the magical City in the Sky.

=== The War of Powers part 1 ===
Fost Longstrider is a courier commissioned to deliver a clay jar to the powerful mage Kest-i-mond. When he finds his client dead, Fost discovers that the jar contains the spirit of the long-dead philosopher Erimenes the Ethical, a man who once preached the value of total abstinence. Fourteen hundred years as a ghost have given him time to reflect, however, and he now preaches a philosophy of total hedonism and bloodlust. His value to Kest-i-mond is his knowledge of the whereabouts of the Amulet of Living Flame, a mystical talisman that will grant eternal life. Falling in with the beautiful Princess Moriana, who plans to use the amulet to overthrow her evil sister Synalon and reclaim her throne, Fost and Erimenes set out on a journey to recover the relic.

Pursued by Moriana’s sadistic cousin Prince Rann, they finally come to the glacier-locked city of Athalau, site of the last great battle between the Star Demon Istu and Felarod the Mystic which took place ten thousand years before.

Venturing inside the city they eventually discover a shining black and white jewel of incredible workmanship. Hung next to it is a plain stone talisman which the two ignore. Up until this point, Moriana and Fost have avoided the question of who will take the amulet, but the matter is resolved when Moriana stabs Fost through the heart as he reaches for it. Sobbing with grief, Moriana folds Fost's hands over the unremarkable stone, which he grasped in his death throes, and takes the black and white jewel before leaving the city in the company of Ziore, the ghost of an embittered nun who once followed Erimenes' teachings of denial.

After some time, Fost regains consciousness. It seems that the unregarded stone on his chest is, in fact, the Amulet of Living Flame which has exhausted its final energies in reviving him. Fost learns from the abandoned Erimenes that Moriana has mistakenly taken the Destiny Stone, a jewel capable of altering its wearer's luck for good or ill. Despite her treachery, Fost realises that he still loves Moriana and he and Erimenes set off in pursuit to warn her of her mistake.

Meanwhile, Moriana attempts to raise an army from the northern kingdoms to retake her city. At first her recruitment drive is unsuccessful, but Synalon soon changes their minds when she launches a war of conquest against the other city states of the Sundered Realm. The two sides clash in a titanic battle, but the Destiny Stone betrays Moriana, leading to her defeat. She is able to escape, and in desperation decides to contact the reptilian Fallen Ones, the original builders of the Sky City, with hopes of forming an alliance. The book ends as Fost arrives on the battlefield. He is too late to intercept the Princess, and the garbled last words of a dying soldier mislead him into thinking she has returned to the Sky City. He announces his decision to follow her.

=== The War of Powers part 2 ===
Synalon Etuul has begun her conquest of The Sundered Realm, and Moriana's first attempt to reclaim the City in the Sky has failed. With Fost working with the Sky City Resistance, Moriana attempts to enlist the aid of the Fallen Ones, the reptilian builders of the city who were overthrown several millennia before.

Forming an alliance with the Fallen Ones, Moriana finally retakes the city but is betrayed at the last by the leader of the reptiles who uses his magic to free the demon Istu, who has been chained to the bedrock of the floating city since the War of Powers ten thousand years before. Now, with the Fallen Ones in control of the city and Istu released from his prison, they embark on a crusade to eliminate the human race.

Forced into an uneasy alliance with Synalon and Prince Rann, Fost and Moriana rally humanity's survivors but are gradually forced back to the ancient city of Athalau. They form a plan to summon the World Spirit, as Felarod the Mystic did during the War of Powers, with the hope that this time they can destroy Istu utterly. With the help of Felarod's descendants, Moriana contacts the World Spirit but cannot control it. Synalon then steps forward, volunteering to focus the power that Moriana wields. Gaining access to the Sky City, Rann and Fost fight side by side to protect Synalon while she channels the World Spirit. After a titanic battle Synalon is able to destroy Istu, but is then killed when the city collides with a mountain and is destroyed. Just before the city's destruction Fost straps the mortally wounded Rann onto the back of his war eagle and escapes.

With the Fallen Ones defeated, Fost and Moriana turn to rebuilding the reborn Athalau.

== Reception ==
David Langford characterized the series as "968 pages of junk food for the mind."

Dave Langford reviewed The War of Powers Part II: Istu Awakened for White Dwarf #63, and stated that "People who like routine sword-and-sorcery, with a killing or orgasm (sometimes both) every few pages, will no doubt love this book. These two books. These six books..."

Colin Greenland reviewed The War of Powers and Istu Awakened for Imagine magazine, and stated that "'Realistic, adult and funny' said Science Fiction Review, but three different adjectives spring to my mind: crude, sleazy and crass."

== Sources ==
- Vardeman, Robert E. & Milán, Victor, (1980 - 1985) The War of Powers, Series Book 1-6
