= The Prometheus Design =

1982 novel by Sondra Marshak and Myrna Culbreath

- Cover
- Authors: Sondra Marshak; Myrna Culbreath
- Language: English
- Genre: Science fiction
- Publisher: Pocket Books
- Publication date: 15 March 1982
- Publication place: United States
- Media type: Print (paperback)
- Pages: 190
- ISBN: 0-671-72366-9 (first edition, paperback)
- Preceded by: The Covenant of the Crown
- Followed by: The Abode of Life

The Prometheus Design is a novel from the Star Trek: The Original Series collection, authored by Sondra Marshak and Myrna Culbreath.

== Plot ==
The U.S.S. Enterprise arrives to assist the Helvans, who are facing a surge of violence, with revolutions, mass riots, and unimaginable tortures sweeping their planet. Captain Kirk and his crew quickly realize that this chaos is no mere coincidence, but rather part of a sinister experiment controlled by an unimaginable power. This dark force soon extends its grip to the Enterprise itself. Captain Kirk begins experiencing violent hallucinations, rendering him unfit for command and forcing Commander Spock to step in. However, under Spock's leadership, the crew is disturbed to find his orders as irrational and cruel as the violence on Helva. Unless this terrible power can be stopped, not only the Enterprise, but an entire galaxy may fall victim to the deadly design of Prometheus.
