= The Covenant of the Crown =

1981 novel by Howard Weinstein

- Author: Howard Weinstein
- Language: English
- Genre: Science fiction
- Publisher: Pocket Books
- Publication date: December 1981
- Publication place: United States
- Media type: Print (paperback)
- Pages: 191
- ISBN: 0-671-83307-3 (first edition, paperback)
- OCLC: 23788607
- LC Class: CPB Box no. 2483 vol. 19
- Preceded by: The Klingon Gambit
- Followed by: The Prometheus Design

The Covenant of the Crown is a science fiction novel by American writer Howard Weinstein, part of the Star Trek: The Original Series franchise.

== Plot ==
Spock, McCoy and Kailyn, the beautiful heir to the Shaddan throne are the only survivors of an Enterprise shuttle crash on the barren planet of Sigma 1212. The three must survive Klingon scouts and literally reclaim the Shaddan crown, or else risk a Klingon territorial takeover.
