= Web of the Romulans =

1983 novel by M. S. Murdock

- Cover
- Author: M. S. Murdock
- Language: English
- Series: Star Trek: The Original Series
- Genre: Science fiction
- Publisher: Pocket Books
- Publication date: 1 June 1983
- Publication place: United States
- Media type: Print (Paperback)
- Pages: 220
- ISBN: 0-671-46479-5 (first edition, paperback)
- OCLC: 9615228
- LC Class: CPB Box no. 2983 vol. 23
- Preceded by: Triangle
- Followed by: Yesterday's Son

Web of the Romulans is a Star Trek: The Original Series novel written by M. S. Murdock. The subplot where the Enterprise falls in love with Captain James T. Kirk was taken from a story that Murdock had originally written for a Star Trek fanzine.

== Plot ==
A deadly virus causes desperate Romulans to invade Canara and incite a battle with the USS Enterprise. Captain James T. Kirk, fully willing to get the antidote to the Romulans, has to deal with the ship's central computer which has developed romantic feelings for Kirk.

== Production ==
Author Melinda Murdock was first introduced to Star Trek: The Original Series while she was in college in 1969. She tuned into an episode already in progress and thought it was "marvellous". However, due to her black and white television, she was unable to recognise what show was on. She didn't realise what it was until the series was re-broadcast on local TV, and she identified the episode as "A Piece of the Action".

She became involved in a Star Trek fanzine, and wrote a story for it where the Enterprise computer falls in love with Captain Kirk. After she heard about Pocket Books accepting unsolicited manuscripts for Star Trek novels, she expanded the idea as a complication to a more serious main plot. She was between jobs at the time, and wrote the first draft of the novel in six weeks. After submitting it to the publishers, she didn't hear anything back. Murdock would chase once every six months or so and after nearly three months, she received word that they would like the manuscript to be expanded. When she was around two thirds of the way through the expansion, Pocket Books contacted her and confirmed that they wanted to buy the novel.

Murdock was pleased with the published novel, as she felt that finished manuscript was unchanged from the expanded version she submitted to the publishers. However, they changed the title as she had been calling it We Who Are About To Die, which she preferred. She was concerned that calling the novel Web of the Romulans might confuse readers into thinking it had something to do with the episode "The Tholian Web". It had been changed because Pocket Books had another book coming out with a similar title, although Murdock suspected that they had also published several books with "Web" in the title during that year.

== Reception ==
Web of the Romulans was the first original Star Trek novel to reach the US bestseller lists.

In Robert Greenberger's analysis of the novelizations of Star Trek for Starlog, he described Web of the Romulans as an "interesting examination" of the Romulan culture and empire. He called the computer love subplot "silly", but overall called it a "well-done and well-conceived novel".

Ken Ramstead reviewed Web of the Romulans in Ares Magazine #17 and commented that "Web makes for good reading. The author has skillfully blended just the right amounts of humor and drama together to create a mixture that will hold any Trekkie's attention - at least until the next Timescape Trek novel appears."
