= The IDIC Epidemic =

1988 novel by Jean Lorrah

- Cover
- Author: Jean Lorrah
- Language: English
- Series: Star Trek: The Original Series
- Genre: Science fiction
- Publisher: Pocket Books
- Publication date: February 1988
- Publication place: United States
- Media type: Print (paperback)
- Pages: 278
- ISBN: 0-671-63574-3 (first edition, paperback)
- Preceded by: Bloodthirst
- Followed by: Time for Yesterday

The IDIC Epidemic is a science fiction novel by American writer Jean Lorrah, part of the Star Trek: The Original Series saga. The novel is a sequel to The Vulcan Academy Murders, and provides an explanation of why the Klingons seen in the original series have a very different appearance from the "Imperial" Klingons with huge forehead ridges seen later. This explanation would later be replaced in Star Trek: Enterprise.

== Premise ==
I.D.I.C. – Infinite Diversity in Infinite Combination – is a philosophical cornerstone of the Vulcan society. Currently, a mysterious plague has hit the planet, which is somehow tied into I.D.I.C and the fact hundreds of races also currently make their home on Vulcan as well. However, Vulcan is also a central part of Starfleet and the Federation as well, so if it falls, war might follow.

== Development ==
The novel takes its name from the Vulcan philosophy concept known as IDIC, an acronym for the phrase, "infinite diversity in infinite combinations". The concept was introduced in the episode, "Is There in Truth No Beauty?", and describes the appreciation of the uniqueness of individuals. The novel, like it's prequel, was based on a fan fiction story written by Lorrah called, The Night of the Twin Moons. The story followed Spock's parents, Sarek and Amanda Greyson, on a visit to a planet dominated by women, and explores the pair's relationship.

== Publication history ==
Initially printed by Pocket Books as Star Trek: The Original Series number thirty-eight, the book would later be reprinted by Titan Books for the UK market, as the seventh book in their numbered Original Series novels, with its prequel, The Vulcan Academy Murders, being reprinted as the twelfth in the series.
