= The Klingon Gambit =

1981 novel by Robert E. Vardeman

- Cover
- Author: Robert E. Vardeman
- Language: English
- Genre: Science fiction
- Publisher: Pocket Books
- Publication date: October 1981
- Publication place: United States
- Media type: Print (paperback)
- Pages: 158
- ISBN: 0-671-83276-X (first edition, paperback)
- OCLC: 8019927
- Preceded by: The Entropy Effect
- Followed by: The Covenant of the Crown

The Klingon Gambit is a science fiction novel by American writer Robert E. Vardeman, part of the Star Trek: The Original Series franchise. It was first published by Pocket Books in 1981.

== Synopsis ==
The Klingon ship Terror has recently murdered the innocent crew of a Vulcan science ship. The Enterprise is sent to meet this new threat, only to fall apart from within. Crew members throw immature temper tantrums. Orders are ignored. One by one, the crew are losing their minds.
