= Black Fire (novel) =

1983 novel by Sonni Cooper

- Cover
- Author: Sonni Cooper
- Language: English
- Series: Star Trek: The Original Series
- Genre: Science fiction
- Publisher: Pocket Books
- Publication date: 1 January 1983
- Publication place: United States
- Media type: Print (Paperback)
- Pages: 220 pp
- ISBN: 0-671-70548-2 (first edition, paperback)
- Preceded by: Star Trek II: The Wrath of Khan
- Followed by: Triangle

Black Fire is a Star Trek: The Original Series novel written by Sonni Cooper. It is the first Star Trek novel to make the bestseller list.

== Plot ==
An explosion destroys the bridge of the Enterprise, killing trainee crewmembers and severely injuring the main crew. Spock ignores a chunk of metal in his spine to take command and figure out exactly what happened.

His investigation soon leads him and the Enterprise's Chief Engineer Montgomery Scott to the discovery of the Tomarii, an alien race who reveres war and conflict. Despite being urged by Scott and others to take the time to have his injuries treated, Spock refuses to do so. Scott and Spock meet with a small grouping of Romulans and Klingons, all three races having been attacked. The grouping is captured by the Tomarii, who use them in other conflicts.

Meanwhile, Spock has been framed for the explosion and Captain Kirk, recovering from his own wounds, must clear his friend's name.
