= Jean Lorrah =

American writer (born 1940)

- Born: 1940 (age 85–86); United States
- Education: Florida State University (PhD)
- Writing career
- Genres: Science fiction and fantasy
- Notable awards: Lord Ruthven Award (2002)

Jean Lorrah (born 1940) is an American science fiction and fantasy author. She has produced several Star Trek novels, frequently with her writing and business partner Jacqueline Lichtenberg. Her most recent work with Lichtenberg is on the Sime~Gen Universe. Her 1980s fantasy series The Savage Empire is mostly solo work.

Lorrah taught English at Murray State University from 1968 to 2008 and received her Ph.D. from Florida State University. She was the first female non-nursing/home economics doctorate professor hired at MSU.

== Bibliography ==
=== "Savage Empire" series ===
- Savage Empire (1981)
- Dragon Lord of the Savage Empire (1982)
- Captives of the Savage Empire (1984)
- Flight to the Savage Empire (1986) (with Winston Howlett)
- Sorcerers of the Frozen Isles (1986)
- Wulfston's Odyssey (1986) (with Winston Howlett)
- Empress Unborn (1988)
- Dark Moon Rising (omnibus) (2004) - reprinted collection of the first three novels
- Prophecies (omnibus) (2004) - reprinted collection of the fourth and fifth novels

=== "Nessie" series (with Lois Wickstrom) ===
- Nessie and The Living Stone (2001)
- Nessie and the Viking Gold (2003)

=== "Sime~Gen" series ===
- First Channel (1980) (with Jacqueline Lichtenberg)
- Channel's Destiny (1982) (with Jacqueline Lichtenberg)
- Ambrov Keon (1985)
- Zelerod's Doom (1986) (with Jacqueline Lichtenberg)
- The Unity Trilogy (2003) (omnibus) (with Jacqueline Lichtenberg)

=== Non-series novels ===
- Pandora No 6 (1980)
- Blood Will Tell (2001)

=== Star Trek series contributions ===
==== Star Trek fan fiction ====
- Full Moon Rising (1976)
- The Night of the Twin Moons (1976)
- Epilogue: Part I (1977)
- Epilogue: Part II (1978)

==== Star Trek: The Original Series ====
- The Vulcan Academy Murders (1984)
- The IDIC Epidemic (1988)

==== Star Trek: The Next Generation ====
- Survivors (1988)
- Metamorphosis (1990)
