= Sime~Gen Universe =

Fictional universe created by Jacqueline Lichtenberg

The Sime~Gen Universe is a science fictional literary universe created by American writer Jacqueline Lichtenberg. It involves a future when humanity is divided into two subspecies, or larities: Gens, who look like ordinary humans and produce excess quantities of a life energy called selyn, and Simes, who have tentacled arms and must take selyn from Gens in order to survive. If the Gen is frightened and resisting when selyn is taken, the Gen dies. The series chronicles the history of the two subspecies' search for coexistence.

== Overview ==
Simes and Gens have traditionally lived in separate territories. Simes raise Gens in captivity, like food animals in pens. Children might become either Sime or Gen at puberty, and free Gens kill their children in self-defense if they start to change—if the child becomes Sime, it might take selyn from parents or loved ones, killing them.

Simes who can take selyn from frightened Gens without killing them are "channels". They can pass the selyn gathered to other Simes. The discovery of the channels leads to Unity. Sime and Gen territories declare an uneasy truce, and channels strive to assist both sides.

Lichtenberg began the series in the late 1960s as part of a creative writing class, and put it aside briefly to work on the Kraith series of Star Trek fan fiction.

== Published works ==
- "Operation High Time" (short story, If, January 1969)
- "The Channel's Exemption" (short story, Galileo, July 1977)
- First Channel (with Jean Lorrah, 1980; #1)
- Channel's Destiny (with Jean Lorrah, 1982; #2)
- Ambrov Keon (by Jean Lorrah, 1986; The Unity Trilogy #2; #3 overall)
- House of Zeor (1974; The Unity Trilogy #1; #4 overall)
- Zelerod's Doom (1986; The Unity Trilogy #3; #5 overall)
- Unto Zeor, Forever (1978; #6)
- Mahogany Trinrose (1981; #7)
- RenSime (1984; #8)
- Personal Recognizance / The Story Untold and Other Sime-Gen Stories (2011; two titles published in back-to-back format; #9 and #10)
- To Kiss or To Kill: Sime-Gen, Book Eleven (by Jean Lorrah; #11)
- The Farris Channel (2011; #12)

Personal Recognizance / The Story Untold contains the essay "Chronology of the Sime~Gen Universe."

There is also an extensive collection of fan-fiction available online, particularly through the official fan site at http://www.simegen.com

== Video game ==
- Ambrov X (release date TBD), a story-driven, role-playing PC game based on the Sime-Gen universe, is being produced by studio Loreful.
