= Bloodthirst (novel) =

Book by Jeanne Kalogridis

- Cover
- Author: J.M. Dillard
- Language: English
- Series: Star Trek: The Original Series
- Genre: Science fiction
- Publisher: Pocket Books
- Publication date: 1 December 1987
- Publication place: United States
- Media type: Print (paperback)
- Pages: 264
- ISBN: 0-671-64489-0 (first edition, paperback)
- OCLC: 17242533
- Preceded by: How Much for Just the Planet?
- Followed by: The IDIC Epidemic

Bloodthirst is a science fiction novel by American author Jeanne Kalogridis (writing as J.M. Dillard), part of the Star Trek: The Original Series franchise. It was published in December 1987 by Pocket Books. The novel's story focuses on a manmade virus which causes its victims to suffer many of the characteristics of vampires, including light sensitivity and a thirst for blood.

== Plot summary ==
The Enterprise is called to a remote bio-research lab on planet Tanis to answer a distress call, finding only a single survivor upon arrival. The survivor, Dr. Adams, is uncooperative in discussing the details of the research on Tanis, or how the other members of the research team died. Eventually, it is revealed that Tanis was an illegal biological warfare lab, run by a secret faction within Starfleet. The story also focuses on a security officer, Stanger, who becomes infected after an attack by Dr. Adams.
