= Robert E. Vardeman =

American writer

- Born: Robert Edward Vardeman; 1947 (age 78–79); Mineral Wells, Texas, U.S.
- Education: University of New Mexico (BS, MS)
- Occupation: Writer
- Writing career
- Pen name: Daniel Moran; F.J. Hale; Edward S. Hudson; Victor Appleton; Karl Lassiter; Jackson Lowry; Paul Kenyon; Cliff Garnet
- Genre: Science fiction
- Notable works: The Klingon Gambit (1981); Mutiny on the Enterprise (1983); The War of Powers
- Website: www.cenotaphroad.com

Robert Edward Vardeman (sometimes called Vardebob) (born 1947) is an American science fiction fan and writer.

== Career ==
Robert E. Vardeman was born in Mineral Wells, Texas, but is a longtime resident of Albuquerque, New Mexico. He graduated from the University of New Mexico with a B.S. in physics and a M.S. in materials science. He worked for Sandia National Laboratories in the Solid State Physics Research Department before becoming a full-time writer. He got his start in writing by writing for science fiction fanzines, and was nominated for the 1972 Hugo Award for Best Fan Writer. Vardeman is one of the founders of Bubonicon, a science fiction convention in Albuquerque, New Mexico.

=== Pseudonyms ===
The first volume in Vardeman's Keys to Paradise fantasy series was credited to the pseudonym "Daniel Moran", the publisher possibly being unaware of author Daniel Keys Moran, but the second book in that series then stated that Vardeman was "writing as Daniel Moran." Vardeman started publishing two other series under pseudonyms in the late 1980s – the fantasy series After the Spell Wars under the name F.J. Hale, and the Star Frontier science fiction series under the name of Edward S. Hudson. Both of these series were partially republished under Vardeman's own name. He also wrote Gateway to Doom (1983) from Tom Swift III, and The Microbots (1992) and Mutant Beach (1992), part of the Tom Swift IV series of books under the house pen name, Victor Appleton; as well as writing numerous westerns under the pen names Karl Lassiter and Jackson Lowry. He also wrote in the mid-1970s for Book Creations, Inc., under house pseudonym Paul Kenyon for The Baroness series, but the book was canceled before publication. Similar work includes eight novels written for the Nick Carter adventure series, the novel Sea Fire under the name Cliff Garnett, more than 100 novels written for a major western series, plus eight novels written for another western series that was less enduring.

== Works ==
He is the author of more than fifty fantasy and science fiction novels. An anthology of his short fiction, Stories From Desert Bob's Reptile Ranch, was published in 2007.

=== Star Trek ===
He wrote the original story novels Mutiny on the Enterprise focusing on Captain Kirk battling his own crew, and The Klingon Gambit, another official Star Trek novel.

=== Science fiction and fantasy ===
Vardeman's fantasy series include The War of Powers (six volumes co-authored with Victor Milán), Cenotaph Road (six volumes of science fantasy), Swords of Raemllyn (nine volumes co-authored with Geo. W. Proctor), The Jade Demons (four books), The Keys to Paradise trilogy, The Demon Crown trilogy, and a British-published trilogy called The Accursed. Vardeman also wrote the novelizations of the fantasy game series, God of War and Ruins of Power, a MechWarrior: Dark Age story.

Vardeman's science fiction works include the Weapons of Chaos, Masters of Space and Biowarriors trilogies, and the stand-alone novels The Sandcats of Rhyl, Road to the Stars, and Ancient Heavens. The 1991 techno-thriller Death Fall is a related novel, although works set in a contemporary setting are often not categorized as science fiction.

=== Mysteries ===
Vardeman also wrote a series of three mystery novels involving the "psychic detective" Peter Thorne: The Screaming Knife, The Resonance of Blood and Death Channels.

=== Game tie-ins ===
Vardeman has written a number of game-related tie in works, including:

- Dark Legacy (1996) – for the Magic: The Gathering game
- The Great Helium War (1998) – for the Crimson Skies game
- Hell Heart (2000) – for the Vor: The Maelstrom game
- Ruins of Power (2003) – for the Mechwarrior: Dark Age branch of the Battletech game
- God of War (2010) – novelization of the game of the same name with Matthew Stover
- God of War II (2013) – novelization of the sequel
