= Triangle (novel) =

1983 novel by Sondra Marshak and Myrna Culbreath

- Authors: Sondra Marshak; Myrna Culbreath
- Language: English
- Series: Star Trek: The Original Series
- Genre: Science fiction
- Publisher: Pocket Books
- Publication date: March 1983
- Publication place: United States
- Media type: Print (paperback)
- Pages: 188
- ISBN: 0-671-74351-1 (first edition, paperback)
- OCLC: 63083895
- Preceded by: Black Fire
- Followed by: Web of the Romulans

Triangle is a Star Trek: The Original Series novel written by Sondra Marshak and Myrna Culbreath.

== Plot ==
Both Captain Kirk and Commander Spock have fallen in love with the same woman, Federation Free Agent Sola Than. This situation ties into the galaxy-threatening danger of the immense intelligence known as the 'Totality'.
