= Wikström =

Wikström is a Swedish and Finnish surname.

== Geographical distribution ==
As of 2014, 75.2% of all known bearers of the surname Wikström were residents of Sweden (frequency 1:1,640) and 23.1% of Finland (1:2,978).

In Sweden, the frequency of the surname was higher than national average (1:1,640) in the following counties:

1. Jämtland County (1:632)
2. Norrbotten County (1:648)
3. Västerbotten County (1:666)
4. Gävleborg County (1:729)
5. Västernorrland County (1:878)
6. Dalarna County (1:914)
7. Värmland County (1:1,217)
8. Västmanland County (1:1,358)
9. Gotland County (1:1,426)

In Finland, the frequency of the surname was higher than national average (1:2,978) in the following regions:

1. Åland (1:598)
2. Central Ostrobothnia (1:787)
3. Ostrobothnia (1:1,080)
4. Uusimaa (1:1,390)
5. Southwest Finland (1:2,038)

== People ==
- Axel Wikström (1907–1976), Swedish skier
- Cecilia Wikström (born 1965), Swedish politician
- Christoffer Wikström (born 1987), Swedish swimmer
- Emil Wikström (1864–1942), Finnish sculptor
- John Wikström, Swedish skier
- Jonas Wikström (born 1962), Swedish Navy officer
- Leif Wikström (1918–1991), Swedish sailor
- Mikael Wikström (Mike Wead) (born 1967), Swedish guitarist
- Per Wikström (born 1961), Swedish swimmer
- Sami Wikström (born 1967), Finnish ice hockey player
- Volmar Wikström (1889–1957), Finnish wrestler

== See also ==
- Wigström
- Vikström
- Wikstrom, a fictional character from Pokémon X and Y
