= Planet of Judgment =

1977 novel by Joe Haldeman

- First edition
- Author: Joe Haldeman
- Language: English
- Series: Star Trek
- Genre: Science fiction
- Publisher: Bantam Books
- Publication date: August 1977
- Publication place: United States
- Media type: Print (Paperback)
- Pages: 151
- ISBN: 0-553-11145-0
- OCLC: 3195399
- Dewey Decimal: 813.54
- Preceded by: The Price of the Phoenix
- Followed by: Vulcan!

Planet of Judgment (1977) is a science fiction novel by American writer Joe Haldeman, a tie-in of the TV series Star Trek.

== Plot summary ==
The crew of the Starship Enterprise detects a rogue planet (dubbed Anomaly) orbited by a miniature black hole. This seems to contravene all scientific laws. Assuming that the system is artificial, Captain Kirk leads a landing party to the planet's surface, where they become trapped. The crew find themselves at the center of a galactic conflict, in which an alien race is threatening to invade Federation space. Dr. McCoy, Mr. Spock, and Captain Kirk must participate in a series of trials that will determine not just their survival, but that of the Federation.

== Production ==
According to the author, he was approached for a two-book contract at the suggestion of Fred Pohl.
