= Kraith =

Star Trek fan fiction story series

The Kraith stories are a well-known set of early Star Trek fan fiction. The earliest entries were written by Jacqueline Lichtenberg (best known for her later professionally-published Sime~Gen Universe novels) starting in 1969. These continuing through the first few years after the cancellation of the first Star Trek series. The stories are named after the kraith, a goblet or chalice used in the performance of certain Vulcan rituals which feature prominently in several of the stories.

== Background ==
The first few stories, beginning with "Spock's Affirmation", were published in the T Negative fanzine, a publication edited by Ruth Berman in T-Negative 8. As interest grew, later stories were published in a wider range of outlets, and other authors began to make contributions to the sequence of stories. Over fifty amateur and professional authors have contributed to Kraith.

The series' emphasis on stories with sociological, psychological and emotional plotlines had an impact on Star Trek fan fiction. A high proportion of early contributors to the Kraith storyline were women, and this has continued to be reflected in the high proportion of female fan writers.

== Plot ==
The story of Kraith is ostensibly concerned with Spock finding a wife. The series, however, set out to question the presentation, in Star Trek, of humans as the dominant race throughout the galaxy. James Kirk was shown as imposing not only human values, but specifically 20th century American values on them, supposedly for their own good or to save them from being conquered by the Klingons. Lichtenberg's stories showed this as reflecting the overall attitude of the Earth-dominated Federation toward unaffiliated and member worlds, which other cultures and species, which would have different values and might reject capitalism, would object to.

Vulcan, with its monoculture derived from the Reforms of Surak, has been affected by contact with other races. Many Vulcans in the stories feel the changes are not for the better. A major plot arc concerns a proposal that Vulcan secede from the Federation. It is officially voted down, but there are still many who agree with the idea. Lichtenberg's goal was to show that the Vulcan culture we saw on the show was not perfect, and that contact with other civilizations would help post-Reform culture evolve from its present, static form, to "what it ought to become". The friendship between Kirk, Spock, and McCoy became a microcosm reflecting these changes.

Lichtenberg believed that, at the time, most readers were incapable of accepting the ideas she proposed, because they were far too radical or ahead of their time.

Kraith took a different turn with the input of Sondra Marshak as Lichtenberg's chief collaborator. One of Lichtenberg's plot arcs concerned the idea that Kirk, having been in contact with a number of telepathic alien species, had gained telepathy. In order learn control and proper use of his new abilities he came to Vulcan to attend a psychic school. For this and other reasons, some politically complex, he was then adopted by Sarek and educated in the Vulcan way of life. This education had occasionally involved a "Warder-Liege compact" between Kirk and Spock, in which Kirk accepted Spock as his mentor and obeyed his commands (or vice versa, as in the Kraith novel Federation Centennial).

Marshak saw plot possibilities in the Warder-Liege and revived and expanded on its implications. Later Kraith stories are rife with BDSM undertones, and in one entry, Joan Winston's "The Maze" (published in Metamorphosis 2), Spock spanks Kirk as a punishment for disobeying an order in favor of saving Spock's life while under Warder-Liege restrictions.

== Legacy ==
Although the classic Kraith stories are not slash fiction, some commentators have seen Kraith as a precursor to some forms of slash: hurt/comfort themes, and themes of emotional and mental closeness, as well as the BDSM implications later in the series, are clearly closely related to themes found in many slash works.

== See also ==
- Speciesism
- Xenophobia
