= The Entropy Effect =

1981 novel by Vonda N. McIntyre

- Author: Vonda N. McIntyre
- Language: English
- Genre: Science fiction
- Publisher: Pocket Books
- Publication date: June 1981
- Publication place: United States
- Media type: Print (Paperback)
- Pages: 224
- ISBN: 0-671-83692-7 (first edition, paperback)
- OCLC: 7452262
- Preceded by: Star Trek: The Motion Picture
- Followed by: The Klingon Gambit

The Entropy Effect is a science fiction novel by American writer Vonda N. McIntyre, set in the fictional Star Trek Universe. Developed from a screenplay that McIntyre had conceived when she was 18, it was originally published in 1981 and is the first original story in Pocket Books' long-running series of Star Trek novels. The novel includes the first occurrence of given names for the characters Hikaru Sulu and Nyota Uhura, each of which were later made canon.

== Plot summary ==
The Enterprise is making a study of a naked singularity when it is diverted to mining colony Aleph Prime with instructions to ferry a single criminal to a rehabilitation colony in the same solar system. The criminal turns out to be a theoretical physicist, Dr. Georges Mordreaux, convicted of murder and unethical research on self-aware beings. Spock disbelieves that Mordreaux could be capable of the crime. Prosecutor Braithewaite accompanies them on the journey, convinced that Mordreaux is dangerous.

While en route to the penal colony, Mordreaux appears on the bridge, injures Braithwaite, and shoots Kirk and Security Chief Mandala Flynn. Flynn alerts security before she succumbs, but they insist that Mordreaux never left his quarters, which is quickly confirmed. Kirk is rushed to sickbay where Dr. McCoy struggles to save him, but Kirk dies while Spock is mind-melded to him. The disoriented Braithwaite later sees the two terminate the life support that was maintaining Kirk's brain-dead body, causing him to suspect Spock and McCoy of a conspiracy plot.

Spock determines from questioning Mordreaux that he was imprisoned for developing and using a time travel device. Spock concludes that the older Mordreaux who murdered Kirk was from a different timeline in which Mordreaux became insane and returned to take revenge on those he blamed for his persecution. Since Kirk's death was committed through time travel, Spock constructs a time travel device and makes several futile trips back in time, attempting to save Kirk.

An even older version of Mordreaux goes back in time and joins Spock in confronting the younger Mordreaux, at a time just before Mordreaux first uses the device. The strain of so many travels is too much for the oldest Mordreaux's body and he dies. It is revealed that the singularity is the result of Mordreaux's interference with the timeline. The realization by the younger scientist that he would rather die than face the consequences, leads him to destroy his device and his research. Spock returns to the restored timeline to find that all is well, but that he has the memories of both realities. Spock decides not to reveal any of this and informs Kirk that the singularity (now a harmless black hole) will soon destroy itself.

In a subplot, Hikaru Sulu requests a transfer to the fighter ship Aerfen. The novel ends with Kirk granting Sulu a field promotion in order to keep him on the Enterprise.

== Reception ==
Robert Greenberger, the Editor at Starlog Press with responsibility for the Star Trek franchise, reviewed the novel favorably, calling it "captivating reading" and praising the characterization and the "scientific emphasis". It was one of the first novels to explore "beyond the boundaries of the known Trek universe." and the first to give prominence to a supporting character. The novel's success "convinced Pocket Books to assign the subsequent three movie novelizations" to McIntyre.
