= Vikström =

Vikström is a surname of Swedish origin. Notable people with the surname include:

- John Vikström (born 1931), Archbishop emeritus of Finland
- Peter Vikström, wheelchair tennis player
- Thomas Vikström (born 1969), Swedish vocalist

== See also ==
- Wikström
