= The Monthly Aspectarian =

Monthly magazine of personal astrology

- Frequency: Monthly
- Founder: Guy Spiro
- Founded: 1979; 46 years ago
- First issue: 1979
- Country: United States
- Website: monthlyaspectarian.com

The Monthly Aspectraian, founded in 1979 by the late Guy Spiro, an astrologer, was a free print and later online magazine featuring the daily “Astro-Weather” for the upcoming month.

== History and profile ==
Founded in 1979 by Guy Spiro, The Monthly Aspectraian started its publishing the same year. It was based in Morton Grove, a suburb of Chicago, and published under the auspices of Lightworks.

The monthly periodical was distributed in the Milwaukee, Wisconsin area, northwestern Indiana and northern Illinois, as well as nationwide by subscription.

The magazine described itself as "dedicated to awakening consciousness, with the focus of our efforts being in the areas of personal growth, healthy and holistic living, spiritual transformation, and global awareness."

The Monthly Aspectarian was revived in November 2012 as Conscious Community Magazine. The original Monthly Aspectarian had a large section so named featuring a wide variety of diverse modalities from acupuncture to zen meditation.
