= Sean Barrett (writer) =

American writer (born 1959)

Sean Barrett (born 1959) is a writer, nucleonicist, former member of the Wikipedia Arbitration Committee, and the grandson of Linton Lomas Barrett. He is the author of GURPS Lensman: Starkly Astounding Space-Opera Adventure, a book of role-playing instructions carefully based upon the Lensman series by E.E. Smith, and authorized by Dr. Smith's literary executor, Verna Smith Trestrail. He was a nucleonicist on the USS Ohio (SSBN-726), and senior health physicist on the Three Mile Island Unit Two Recovery Team.

== Bibliography ==
- Sean Barrett (2002) [1994]. GURPS Lensman. Steve Jackson Games. ISBN 1-55634-527-5. Contains a self-deprecating autobiographical sketch on p. 4, which is included in the excerpt at Steve Jackson Games.
- Out-Takes from GURPS Lensman
