= Imperial Stars =

1976 novel by Edward Elmer Smith

The Imperial Stars
- First edition
- Author: E. E. "Doc" Smith
- Cover artist: George Barr
- Language: English
- Series: Family D'Alembert
- Genre: Space tragedy, Science fiction novel
- Publisher: Pyramid Books
- Publication date: 1976
- Publication place: United States
- Media type: Print (paperback)
- Pages: 143
- ISBN: 0-515-03839-3
- OCLC: 8957666
- Followed by: Stranglers' Moon

The Imperial Stars is a science fiction novel by Stephen Goldin, expanded from the 1964 novella of the same name by E. E. "Doc" Smith. It is the first in a series of ten Family D'Alembert novels set in a future where humankind has expanded to the stars but reverted to an ancient feudal system of government in an advanced technological setting.

== Plot summary ==
In the year 2447 the Empire of Earth comprises more than a thousand inhabited systems. A threat to the Empire has developed that the Imperial secret service SOTE (the Service Of The Empire) has been unable to foil. In desperation they turn to the Family D'Alembert.

The D'Alemberts are natives of the planet DesPlaines, giving them strength, speed and coordination. They put this to use by operating the "Circus of the Galaxy," a spectacular combination circus/mobile amusement park famous in every inhabited system, entertaining millions and visiting the same planet twice in an average lifetime.

But the circus is also SOTE's best kept secret, known only to the Head, their designated successor, and the Emperor. Managed by the reigning Duke, who is absolute ruler of DesPlains and head of the D'Alembert family, the circus is a proving ground for the best agents available and can provide a cadre of highly skilled professionals in many fields, as needed. Furthermore, security is absolute, because it is run completely by family members who talk only to each other - and the Head.

So when the Circus is summoned to Earth it is time for Jules and Yvette D'Alembert, brother and sister Imperial Stars, to leave their place in the spotlight under the big top to their successors, and become what they were always meant to be: the Empire's top secret agents.

== Characters ==
- Jules D'Alembert - member of the Family D'Alambert, brother to Yvette
- Yvette D'Alembert - member of the Family D'Alambert, sister to Jules
- Emperor Stanley 10 - Emperor of Earth
- Duke Etienne D'Alembert - head of the Family and ruler of DesPlaines
- Banion, Prince of Durwood - pretender to the throne
- Grand Duke Zander von Wilmenhorst - head of SOTE
