= Trek to Madworld =

1979 novel by Stephen Goldin

- Author: Stephen Goldin
- Language: English
- Genre: Science fiction
- Publisher: Bantam Books
- Publication date: January 1979
- Publication place: United States
- Media type: Print (Paperback)
- Pages: 177
- ISBN: 0-553-12618-0
- OCLC: 34726190
- Preceded by: The Starless World
- Followed by: World Without End

Trek to Madworld (1979) is a science fiction novel by American writer Stephen Goldin, first published by Bantam Books in January 1979. One of the original Star Trek novels set in the universe of the original Star Trek television series, it had an introduction by David Gerrold (writer of the Star Trek episode "The Trouble with Tribbles").

== Plot summary ==
The USS Enterprise receives orders to proceed at maximum warp to Epsilon Delta IV, where 700 colonists are slowly perishing due to radiation poisoning. The journey is interrupted by Enowil, an eccentric being of incredible power, who seizes control of the ship. Also seized are Klingon and Romulan starships.

Enowil, requesting aid from all three parties in resolving a purported “private matter,” offers any reward within the scope of his power. Captain Kirk is thus faced with a dilemma: If he opts to decline, both the Romulans and Klingons have the opportunity to acquire a potentially unstoppable weapon, which would disrupt the galactic balance of power. Yet if he chooses to accept, the abandoned 700 colonists on Epsilon Delta IV will most certainly succumb to an agonizing and protracted death.
