= Star Trek Maps =

- Box art
- Authors: Jeffrey Maynard, John Upton, et al.
- Illustrators: Jeffrey Maynard, Michael McMaster, et al.
- Language: English
- Genre: Science fiction
- Publisher: Bantam Books
- Publication date: August 1980
- Publication place: United States
- Media type: Print
- Pages: 31 pp., 4 maps
- ISBN: 0-553-01202-9

Star Trek Maps is a reference work demonstrating the stellar cartography and navigation system featured on the Star Trek television series, written from an in-universe perspective. It was published by Bantam Books in August 1980, and licensed by Paramount Pictures.

The box set included four maps using a four-color scheme intended to be displayed on a wall, and an instructional booklet from the "Technical Publications Section" of Starfleet Command.

== Production ==
A number of artists contributed to the production of the booklet, and wall maps. Many of the contributors would work on later Star Trek productions.

- Jeffrey Maynard, Co-designer and coordinator.
- Michael McMaster, Concept artist.
- Geoffrey Mandel, Astronomical art design.
- Lee Cole, Technical graphics.
- Michael Nicastre and Rick Sternbach, Airbrush art.
- John Upton, instruction manual author.

A number of the artists who worked on Star Trek Maps were involved with other Star Trek productions. Michael McMaster self-published blueprint of the USS Enterprise (NCC-1701) as "Galactic Designs and Productions." Geoffrey Mandel would later become a member of the art department for Star Trek Generations, Deep Space Nine, and Voyager. Lee Cole worked as a scenic artist and set designer for the un-produced Phase II television series, and he later joined the crews of Star Trek: The Motion Picture and The Wrath of Khan. Rick Sternbach was a production illustrator for The Motion Picture, and later for The Next Generation, Deep Space Nine, and Voyager. Larry Nemecek was an uncredited consultant.

== Contents ==
Star Trek Maps box set contains four maps using a four-color scheme intended to be displayed on a wall, and a 31-page staple-bound booklet.

- Introduction to Navigation (booklet): Labelled with an in-universe document number: TM:3001499-03, as published by the Technical Publications Section of Starfleet Command. The text includes historical background, explanations of warp travel, navigation within the Federation, a briefing on course calculations, which include vector calculus, a table of corrections for warp speed designations.
- Chart A – United Federation of Planets: The locations of the core Federation member worlds, and their relation to Earth. Sidebars include projections (called “Astrogation”) of the coordinate system for the galaxy explained in the booklet.
- Chart B – Named Planets and their Primaries, and Planetary Descriptions: Positions of named planets from the television series using a galactic side view. Sidebars include vector drawings of Federation vessels and buoys, and two maps of member worlds more distant from the Federation core.
- Chart C – Enterprise Zone of Patrol, Map Five: Depictions of several worlds featured in the television series. Included scaled maps of the Klingon Empire and an updated map of Earth Outpost Sector Z-6 featured in “Balance of Terror”. Sidebar featured planetary layouts of Sol, Triskelion, Talos, Deneb and Gamma Vertis systems.
- Chart D – Enterprise Zone of Patrol, Map Six: Detailed map of the Rigel system, and depictions of twelve other named words, including Memory Alpha, Sherman’s Planet, Babel and Vulcan.

== Reception ==
William A. Barton of The Space Gamer noted "Star Trek fans of Earth owe a vote of thanks to designer Jeffrey Maynard and to Bantam for taking the time to release these… They should prove a worthwhile purchase to anyone interested in the Star Trek universe."

According to Memory Alpha, maps from the set were featured as part of the 1992 Star Trek exhibition presented by the National Air & Space Museum.

Larry Nemecek created a similarly in-depth package of wall maps and encyclopedic booklet in Stellar Cartography: The Starfleet Reference Library (2013). The maps and text were updated by Nemecek to include information from other Star Trek spin-off series, and films released since 1980, combined with material he contributed to Star Trek: Star Charts (2002).
