= Protostars (book) =

- Cover of Protostars
- Author: edited by David Gerrold and Stephen Goldin
- Cover artist: Gene Szafran
- Language: English
- Genre: Science fiction
- Publisher: Ballantine Books
- Publication date: 1971
- Publication place: United States
- Media type: Print (paperback)
- Pages: x, 271 pp.
- ISBN: 0-345-02393-5

Protostars is an anthology of science fiction short stories edited by David Gerrold and Stephen Goldin. It was first published in paperback by Ballantine Books in October 1971, and has been reprinted a number of times since.

The book collects sixteen novelettes and short stories by various science fiction authors, including a few by the editors, with an introduction by Gerrold.

== Contents ==
- "A Sort of Introduction" (David Gerrold)
- "What Makes a Cage, Jamie Knows" (Scott Bradfield)
- "I'll Be Waiting for You When the Swimming Pool is Empty" (James Tiptree, Jr.)
- "In a Sky of Daemons" (L. Yep)
- "The Last Ghost" (Stephen Goldin)
- "Afternoon with a Dead Bus" (David Gerrold)
- "Eyes of Onyx" (Edward Bryant)
- "The World Where Wishes Worked" (Stephen Goldin)
- "Cold, the Fire of the Phoenix" (Leo P. Kelley)
- "Oasis" (Pamela Sargent)
- "Holdholtzer's Box" (David R. Bunch)
- "The Five-Dimensional Sugar Cube" (Roger Deeley)
- "And Watch the Smog Roll In..." (Barry Weissman)
- "Chances Are" (Alice Laurance)
- " The Naked and the Unashamed" (Robert E. Margroff)
- " My Country, Right or Wrong" (Andrew J. Offutt)
- "Side Effect" (Pg Wyal)
