= Stranglers' Moon =

1976 novel by Stephen Goldin

- First edition
- Author: Stephen Goldin
- Cover artist: George Barr
- Language: English
- Series: Family D'Alembert
- Genre: Science fiction
- Publisher: Pyramid Books
- Publication date: 1976
- Publication place: United States
- Media type: Print (paperback)
- Pages: 159 (paperback 1st UK edition)
- Preceded by: Imperial Stars
- Followed by: The Clockwork Traitor

Stranglers' Moon is a 1976 science fiction novel by American writer Stephen Goldin, the second book in the Family D'Alembert series, the first of which was expanded by Goldin from a novella by E.E. “Doc” Smith.

This is the second in a series of ten Family D'Alembert novels. Set in a future where humankind has expanded to the stars but reverted to an old-style feudal system of government in an advanced technological setting, all known planets and space are ruled by an Earth-based Empire.

== Plot summary ==
Jules and Yvette D'Alembert are a brother and sister team of aerialists in the D'Alembert family Circus of the Empire. But they are also legendary agents "Wombat" and "Periwinkle" in SOTE, "The Service of The Empire", the imperial intelligence agency, sent to investigate the disappearance of a planetary economist and his wife on a moon devoted to recreation: seemingly a vacationers' paradise...

The plot is based in part on Thuggee.
