= Star Trek: The New Voyages =

- First printing (Mar 1976)
- Editor: Sondra Marshak and Myrna Culbreath
- Cover artist: S. Fantoni
- Language: English
- Series: Star Trek
- Subject: Star Trek
- Publisher: Bantam Books X2719
- Publication date: March 1976
- Publication place: United States
- Media type: Print (Paperback)
- Pages: 237
- OCLC: 2106368
- Dewey Decimal: 823.91
- Followed by: Star Trek: The New Voyages 2
- First edition/printing was not assigned an ISBN. Bantam Books catalog: X2719.

Star Trek: The New Voyages (1976) is an anthology of short fiction based on Star Trek, edited by Sondra Marshak and Myrna Culbreath. Although published professionally, the collected stories were written and submitted by fans. Many of the stories were previously published in fanzines, or collected in fan-published anthologies. The New Voyages was commissioned by Frederik Pohl following his acquisition of Star Trek Lives!, which featured essays on the growing Star Trek fandom, and a chapter on Star Trek fan fiction.

From 1976 to 1996, The New Voyages was reprinted twenty times. The final printing by Bantam Spectra, in 1996, featured new cover art by Kazuhiko Sano.

Marshak and Culbreath continued collecting stories for future volumes following publication of the anthology. The "Acknowledgments" page listed an address where manuscript submissions, and feedback, could be delivered.

The New Voyages was followed Star Trek: The New Voyages 2 in 1978.

== Contents ==
- Foreword, by Gene Roddenberry.
- Introduction: The Once and Future Voyages, by Sondra Marshak and Myrna Culbreath.
- "Ni Var," short story by Claire Gabriel; introduction by Leonard Nimoy. Parallel plot to "The Enemy Within". Spock is split between logical and emotional halves, by a deranged scientist. Neither half may exist without the other. Originally published in Quartet.
- "Intersection Point," short story by Juanita Coulson; introduction by James Doohan. Enterprise collides with another dimension, and critical components are lost to space which the crew must retrieve before the ship is destroyed. Originally published in T-Negative, No. 10.
- "The Enchanted Pool," short story by Marcia Ericson; introduction by Nichelle Nichols. Spock learns of his true love, and of the fate of a lost ship, while gazing into reflective waters on a distant world.
- "Visit to a Weird Planet Revisited," short story by Ruth Berman; introduction by Majel Barrett. While filming an episode of Star Trek, Shatner, Nimoy, and Kelley are transported to the real Enterprise, and relentlessly pursued by the Klingon captain Kor. Originally published in Spockanalia, No. 5.
- "The Face on the Barroom Floor," short story by Eleanor Arnason and Ruth Berman; introduction by George Takei. While on vacation, Kirk's white lie is compounded into a problem with no easy solution.
- "The Hunting," short story by Doris Beetem; introduction by Sondra Marshak and Myrna Culbreath. McCoy and Spock find themselves in trouble as a direct result of Spock's Vulcan habits. Originally published in T-Negative, No. 18.
- "The Winged Dreamers," short story by Jennifer Guttridge; introduction by DeForest Kelley. Spock must convince the paranoid crew of the Enterprise that the intense hallucinations they are all experiencing are not real. Originally published in Tricorder Readings, No. 3.
- "Mind-Sifter," short story by Shirley Maiewski; introduction by William Shatner. Kirk is believed dead, but Spock suspects something is amiss. Chekov discovers the key to the truth in the past. Originally published in Showcase, No. 2.
- "Sonnet from the Vulcan: Omicron Ceti Three," poem by Shirley Meech. Originally published in T-Negative, No. 15.
