= Savage Empire =

1981 novel by Jean Lorrah

Savage Empire is a science fantasy novel by American writer Jean Lorrah, published in 1981. It describes two societies have been warring for many years: the psionic Aventine Empire and the barbarians who practice magic.

== Reception ==
Greg Costikyan reviewed Savage Empire in Ares Magazine #9 and commented that "On the whole, Savage Empire is an entertaining though flawed first effort, good enough to justify looking for Lorrah's next novel."

== Reviews ==
- Review by Tom Staicar (1981) in Amazing Stories, September 1981
