= Myrna Culbreath =

American writer

- Born: Myrna Lou Culbreath; September 1, 1938
- Died: October 31, 2025 (aged 87)
- Occupation: Writer
- Writing career
- Language: English
- Years active: 1971–1983
- Genre: Science fiction

Myrna Lou Culbreath (September 1, 1938 – October 31, 2025) is an American science fiction writer and editor, most well-known for the Star Trek tie-in novels and anthologies cowritten with Sondra Marshak. Culbreath was a founding editor of the libertarian editorial newsletter The Fire Bringer.

Her analysis of the Star Trek character Spock, originally published in an issue of The Fire Bringer, was lauded by Gene Roddenberry as the "best analysis ever done" of the character.

== Early life ==
According to a local newspaper in Colorado Springs, Culbreath operated a tutoring school in the early 1960s. The school offered preparation for GED and CLEP tests, as well as reading assistance and tutoring for students with disabilities and disabled veterans. The school had branch offices in Denver and Cortez.

Culbreath was briefly a member of the Young Americans for Freedom. In 1972, she attended the first Libertarian Party convention. Frustrated by the political platform that emerged during the convention, Culbreath "filibustered" until all anti-war messaging was withdrawn from the party's draft platform. She later resigned from the party.

Sometime before 1977, Culbreath moved to Baton Rouge, Louisiana where she shared a home with her writing partner Sondra Marshak.

== Fannish activity ==
In the early-1970s, Culbreath began self-publishing an editorial newsletter under the title The Fire Bringer which focused on libertarian and objectivist issues. Culbreath's correspondence with Gene Roddenberry was frequently quoted in her editorials and cultural analysis. A special issue the newsletter, known by the fanac title "The Star Trek Reprint", collected Culbreath's correspondence with Roddenberry. Included was an analysis of the Spock character which Roddenberry praised during his presentation at Vul-Con 1973, saying it was "required reading for all Star Trek fans."

During the mid-to-late 70's, Culbreath and her writing partner Sondra Marshak were regular guests of honor at science fiction conventions. They were was often joined on-stage by Marshak's mother, nicknamed "Mama-Anna" by fans.

== Career ==
After 1970, Culbreath made a number of attempts at writing a Star Trek episode spec script with Roddenberry's encouragement. Her preferred title for the script was "Triangle". Once renewal of the television series proved unlikely, Roddenberry introduced Culbreath to fan writer Jacqueline Lichtenberg, who then introduced Culbreath to Sondra Marshak. The three corresponded for several months, and Culbreath and Marshak formally met at a Star Trek convention in Baton Rouge in 1974.

Marshak and Culbreath went on to co-author four original Star Trek novels, including Triangle (1983), which was inspired by Culbreath's unfinished script. They also edited two short story anthologies, The New Voyages (1976) and its sequel, which collected two of their stories. Culbreath and Marshak also contributed trivia to The Star Trek Puzzle Manual (1976). She co-wrote the William Shatner biography Shatner: Where No Man (1979) with Marshak and Shatner.

The New Voyages was Culbreath's first professionally published work. However, she was loosely involved with the production of Star Trek Lives! (1975), along with Marshak, Lichtenberg, and television producer Joan Winston.

In the author's notes for The Fate of the Phoenix (1979), Culbreath and Marshak announced a number of forthcoming titles: a fictional travel guide tentatively titled Mr. Spock's Guide to the Planet Vulcan, and a non-Star Trek science fiction novel with William Shatner, and new installments of The New Voyages series. None of the announced titles were published.

Culbreath marketed a phonics reading method she claimed to have developed in the 1960s. She later condensed her method into a board game inspired by Monopoly which was published in 1996. The game was initially sold as The Phonics Game, which included supplementary materials for teachers. In 1999, an revised edition was sold by LearnByGames as PhonicsOpoly, and later PhonOpoly. Marshak contributed supplementary materials, and participated in sales and promotion. In 1997 and 1999, Culbreath filed two patents via the WIPO which described the mechanics for her game. According to the patent applications, Marshak is listed as an inventor and co-creator of PhonicsOpoly.

During a 2004 episode of Zoh Hieronimus's Future Talk podcast, Culbreath was introduced as a well-known television and radio host but no details were given. Following a 2006 interview with Jeff Ayers given for Voyages of Imagination, Culbreath did not publish any new works or make any public appearances.

Culbreath died in October 2025.

== Bibliography ==
| Title | Date | Publisher | ISBN | Notes |
|---|---|---|---|---|
| The Star Trek Puzzle Manual (gamebook) | November 1976 | Bantam Books | 0-553-01054-9 | with Jeff Razzi and Sondra Marshak |
| Shatner: Where No Man… (biography) | December 1979 | Ace Books | 0-441-88975-1 | with William Shatner and Sondra Marshak |

=== Star Trek Adventures (1976–1979) ===
Published by Bantam Books.

| No. | Title | Date | Catalog / ISBN | Notes |
|---|---|---|---|---|
| 1 | Star Trek: The New Voyages (short story collection) | March 1976 | #X2719 | as Editor, with Sondra Marshak |
| 4 | The Price of the Phoenix | July 1977 | 0-553-10978-2 | with Sondra Marshak |
| 6 | Star Trek: The New Voyages 2 (short story collection) | January 1978 | 0-553-11392-5 | as Editor, with Sondra Marshak |
| 12 | The Fate of the Phoenix | May 1979 | 0-553-12779-9 | with Sondra Marshak |

=== Star Trek: The Original Series (1982–83) ===
Published by Pocket Books.

| No. | Title | Date | ISBN | Notes |
|---|---|---|---|---|
| 5 | The Prometheus Design | March 1982 | 0-671-83398-7 | with Sondra Marshak |
| 9 | Triangle | March 1983 | 0-671-83399-5 | with Sondra Marshak |

== Games ==
Phonics reading games attributed to Myrna Culbreath. The games and their mechanics were described in two patents filed via the WIPO.

| Title | Date | Publisher | Notes |
|---|---|---|---|
| The Phonics Game (board game) | October 1996 | A Better Way Games | |
| PhonicsOpoly (board game) | January 1999 | LearnByGames | with Sondra Marshak |
