= Lois Wickstrom =

American novelist

Lois Wickstrom (born August 14, 1948) is a children's author, playwright and scriptwriter. Wickstrom is known for the "Nessie" books written with Jean Lorrah.

== Amanda Mysteries ==
- The Amanda Mini-Mysteries by Lois June Wickstrom and Jack Kershner (2008)

== Nessie Books ==
- Nessie and The Living Stone (2001)
- Nessie and the Viking Gold (2003)
- Nessie and the Celtic Maze (2007)

== Non-series books ==
- Oliver (1991)
- Ladybugs for Loretta (1978), part of the Loretta's Insects series
- Wendell, The Bully (Kindle Edition - Sep 25, 2003), out-of-print
- The Reluctant Spy (Paperback - 2006)
- Children of the Wandering House
- Dream-Shifter
- Mr. Barsin's Toy Emporium
- Code Dog
- Queen of the Fairies
- Flying at Recess
- Showdown at Recess
- Apprentice to the Wicked Witch (2027)
