= Jacqueline Lichtenberg =

American science fiction author (born 1942)

- Born: March 25, 1942 (age 84); Flushing, Queens, New York, U.S.
- Education: University of California, Berkeley
- Occupation: Author
- Writing career
- Years active: 1969–present
- Genre: Science fiction
- Notable works: Sime~Gen Universe (1974–2011); Star Trek Lives! (1975)

Jacqueline Lichtenberg (born March 25, 1942, Flushing, Queens, New York) is an American science fiction author.

== Life ==
In an interview that aired on November 5, 2021, Lichtenberg shared that in sixth-grade she could barely read, so when she contracted the measles her mom introduced her to the teenage science-fiction novel Battle on Mercury by Lester del Rey. At first Lichtenberg had to use the dictionary to read Battle on Mercury, but quickly became an avid science fiction reader. In the 1950s the latest stories were published in science fiction magazines Lichtenberg checked out at the local library, but she was incensed by the poor illustrations that did not match the text in the stories. Lichtenberg inadvertently ended up publishing her first science fiction critique as a letter to the editor of the magazine stating they needed to improve the illustrations, thus setting the stage for her future career as a writer of this genre.

Lichtenberg has a chemistry degree from the University of California, Berkeley.

== Writing career ==
Many of her early novels are set in the Sime~Gen Universe, which she first described in a short story in 1969. Writing the series satisfied her preference for "'Intimacy'—the kind of relationship between the character and other characters, between the character and the universe, or between the character and him/herself, that brings trust into life" over "Action," a genre she "seriously dislike[s]." Her other writings have dealt with fantasy and occult subjects, including articles on Buffy the Vampire Slayer. She has written a monthly review column on science fiction, under the title "Science Fiction", for The Monthly Aspectarian. Under the pen name 'Daniel R. Kerns', she has published two novels, Hero and Border Dispute.

Many of her works have been written in collaboration with Jean Lorrah, with whom Lichtenberg has a business partnership. A Star Trek fan, she has been actively involved in the Trekkie fan movement. In particular, she wrote the first Kraith Star Trek fan fiction. She is one of the Friends of Darkover and her early writing was mentored by Marion Zimmer Bradley.

== Sime~Gen Universe ==
Lichtenberg's Sime~Gen series involves a distant future where human beings have evolved into two races, with a predator-prey relationship. New York Times critic Gerald Jonas described Sime~Gen collection as combining "qualities of both porn and the soaps ... because they deal obsessively with the physical union between the two races". The physical union between Sime and Gen, which is not actually sexual, provides the Sime with a life-giving substance known as selyn, produced only within a Gen's body.

The Sime~Gen series began with Lichtenberg's Operation High Time, a short story published in 1969. It followed with her first novel in 1974, House of Zeor. As Lichtenberg continued work on the Sime~Gen series in the 1970s, science fiction writers Marion Zimmer Bradley and Hal Clement provided encouragement and mentoring, teaching her more of the "craft and trade of writing". She also became involved with writing partner Jean Lorrah, who co-authored First Channel (1980) with Lichtenberg.

In the 1970s, dedicated fans of this series created the fanzine A Companion in Zeor, first published in June 1978 by Karen MacLeod.

== Bibliography ==
=== Sime~Gen Universe series ===
- House of Zeor (1974)
- Unto Zeor Forever (1978)
- First Channel (1980) – with Jean Lorrah
- Mahogany Trinrose (1981)
- Channel's Destiny (1982) – with Jean Lorrah
- Rensime (1984)
- Ambrov Keon (1986) – written by Jean Lorrah
- Zelerod's Doom (1986) – with Jean Lorrah
- The Unity Trilogy (2003) – compendium of House of Zeor, Ambrov Keon (written by Jean Lorrah), and Zelerod's Doom.
- To Kiss or To Kill (unpublished) – compendium of To Kiss or To Kill (novel written by Jean Lorrah), Best of Fools (novelette written by Jean Lorrah), and Personal Recognizance (novella written by Jacqueline Lichtenberg) - this anthology was scheduled to be published in 2005 by Meisha Merlin, but the publisher folded before publication
- Personal Recognizance/The Story Untold and Other Sime~Gem Stories (2011) an omnibus containing Personal Recognizance (novel written by Jacqueline Lichtenberg), Best of Fools (novelette by Jean Lorrah), "The Story Untold" (short story by Jean Lorrah), and "Reflection of a Dream" (short story by Jean Lorrah)
- The Farris Channel (2011)
- Fear and Courage (2015) (anthology, with others)
- A Change of Tactics (2017) (with Jean Lorrah and Mary Lou Mendum)
- A Shift of Means (2019) (with Jean Lorrah and Mary Lou Mendum)
- A Test of Courage (2023) (with Mary Lou Mendum)

=== Lifewave series ===
- Molt Brother (1982)
- City of a Million Legends (1985)

=== Dushau trilogy ===
- Dushau (1985)
- Farfetch (1985)
- Outreach (1986)

=== Dreamers series ===
- Those of My Blood (1988)
- Dreamspy (1989)

=== As by Daniel R. Kerns ===
- Hero (1993)
- Border Dispute (1994)

=== Short fiction ===
- "Operation High Time" (1969)
- "Recompense" (1976) – Galileo, #2, December
- "The Channel's Exemption" (1977) – Galileo, #4, July
- "The Vanillamint Tapestry" (1978) – In Laurance, Alice, ed. Cassandra Rising. An anthology of original science fiction stories by women. Doubleday. (ISBN 0-385-12857-6)
- "The Answer" (1980) – with Jean Lorrah, In Bradley, Marion Zimmer, ed., The Keeper's Price, and Other Stories.
- "Science is Magic Spelled Backwards" (1982) – collected in Hecate's Cauldron, DAW ISBN 978-0-87997-705-4
- "Event At Holiday Rock" (1982) – collected in Speculations, Houghton Mifflin ISBN 978-0-395-32065-5
- "Through the Moon Gate" (1988) – Tales of the Witchworld, No. 2
- "False Prophecy" (1989) – Tarot Tales, ISBN 978-0-7126-2471-8
- "Aventura" (1989) – Marion Zimmer Bradley's Fantasy Magazine, No. 6; and The Best of Marion Zimmer Bradley's Fantasy Magazine (1994) ISBN 978-0-446-60140-5
- "A Mother's Curse" (1992) – Midnight Zoo, 1992 ed.
- "Vampire's Fast" (1994) – serialized in Galaxy Science Fiction
- "True Death" (1995) – sequel to "Vampire's Fast," in Galaxy Science Fiction
- "Vampire's Friend" (2002) – sequel to "True Death"; collected in Heaven and Hell: An Anthology of Whimsical Stories, Speculation Press ISBN 978-0-9671979-8-2
- "True Hospitality" (2006) – collected in Through the Moon Gate and Other Tales of Vampirism (2011) ISBN 978-1-4344-1233-1
- "Best of Fools" – with by Jean Lorrah
- "Ruella and the Stone" (2006)

=== Non-fiction ===
- Star Trek Lives! (1975) – with Sondra Marshak and Joan Winston
- The Biblical Tarot: Never Cross A Palm With Silver (1997)
- The Not So Minor Arcana, Books 1, 2, 3, 4, 5: Compiled Into One Volume (2015)
