= Sondra Marshak =

American science-fiction writer (born 1942)

- Born: Sondra Hassan; June 15, 1942 (age 84); United States
- Spouse: Alan Marshak
- Children: 1
- Writing career
- Language: English
- Years active: 1973–1983
- Genre: Science fiction

Sondra Marshak (née Hassan; born June 15, 1942) is an American science-fiction writer. She is most well known for her work co-written with Myrna Culbreath. She was a co-writer of Star Trek Lives! (1975), with Jacqueline Lichtenberg, and television producer Joan Winston. She was an early promoter of Star Trek fan culture, and a publisher of fan fiction.

== Early life ==
Marshak was born to Albert Hassan and Anna Tornheim in 1942. Little is known of her early life. In an interview for Voyages of Imagination (2006) by Jeff Ayers, Myrna Culbreath explained that Marshak had earned a master's degree in history, with "straight-A honors," prior to their meeting, and that Marshak had planned to enter a doctoral program. She married LSU professor Alan Marshak, and had one son.

== Fannish activity ==
Upon being introduced to Star Trek on television, Marshak was struck by the "powerful relationship between Kirk and Spock and the focus on moral and philosophical issues." She began writing fan fiction based on the series, and submitted dozens of stories to fanzines. Her correspondence with zine editors and other writers led to an introduction to Jacqueline Lichtenberg. Marshak's first fanzine-published story was a re-write of Spock's Decision, originally written by Lichtenberg, which was anthologized in the fanzines Berengaria #2 and Kraith Collected #4 in 1974. Marshak's subsequently wrote a number of stories set in Lichtenberg's Kraith universe, which was loosely based on Star Trek.

During the mid-to-late 70's, Marshak and her writing partner Myrna Culbreath were regular guests of honor at science fiction conventions. They were was often joined on-stage by Marshak's mother, nicknamed "Mama-Anna" by fans.

Marshak is an Objectivist, and she believes Star Trek advances objectivist ideals.

== Career ==
Marshak's first professional publication was the reference work Star Trek Lives! (1975), co-written with Lichtenberg and Joan Winston. The ninth chapter, "Do-It-Yourself Star Trek," discussed structure and themes in fan fiction and how they may reflect the cultural and sexual ideas of the fans who write them. The book, and in particular the book's final chapter, inspired Francesca Coppa to call Marshak and her fellow authors "the foremothers of 'fanfiction scholarship'" in The Fanfiction Reader (2017).

Marshak co-wrote six Star Trek tie-in books with her writing partner, Myrna Culbreath, in addition to the William Shatner biography Shatner: Where No Man... (December 1979). In Voyages of Imagination, both Culbreath and Marshak described their writing partnership as "virtually a Vulcan mind-meld." She also contributed trivia to The Star Trek Puzzle Manual (1976) by Jeff Razzi.

In the author's notes for The Fate of the Phoenix (1979), several projects were listed as forthcoming. In addition to follow-ups to The New Voyages series, Marshak and Culbreath announced a fictional travel guide, Mr. Spock's Guide to the Planet Vulcan, a new novel co-written by Nichelle Nichols, Uhura!, and a non-Star Trek science fantasy novel co-written by William Shatner, The Power. None of the books were realized, nor published if completed.

Marshak has not published new works since 1983. She promoted PhonicsOpoly (1999), a phonics reading game co-invented with Culbreath, in an 2000 interview for the Orange County Business Journal. Her last interview was for Jeff Ayer's 2006 Star Trek reference Voyages of Imagination. In 2012, Jacqueline Lichtenberg wrote a comment to blog by critic Steve Donoghue concerning Marshak's lack of an online presence.

== Bibliography ==
Title	Date	Publisher	ISBN	Notes
The Star Trek Puzzle Manual (gamebook)	November 1976	Bantam Books	0-553-01054-9	with Jeff Razzi and Myrna Culbreath
Shatner: Where No Man... (biography)	December 1979	Ace Books	0-441-88975-1	with William Shatner and Myrna Culbreath
PhonicsOpoly (board game)	January 1999	LearnByGames		with Myrna Culbreath

=== Star Trek Adventures (1976–1979) ===
Published by Bantam Books.

No.	Title	Date	Catalog / ISBN	Notes
1	Star Trek: The New Voyages (short story collection)	March 1976	#X2719	as Editor, with Myrna Culbreath
4	The Price of the Phoenix	July 1977	0-553-10978-2	with Myrna Culbreath
6	Star Trek: The New Voyages 2 (short story collection)	January 1978	0-553-11392-5	as Editor, with Myrna Culbreath
12	The Fate of the Phoenix	May 1979	0-553-12779-9	with Myrna Culbreath

=== Star Trek: The Original Series (1982–83) ===
Published by Pocket Books.

No.	Title	Date	ISBN	Notes
5	The Prometheus Design	March 1982	0-671-83398-7	with Myrna Culbreath
9	Triangle	March 1983	0-671-83399-5	with Myrna Culbreath
