= The Price of the Phoenix =

1977 novel by Sondra Marshak and Myrna Culbreath

- First printing (July 1977)
- Authors: Sondra Marshak; Myrna Culbreath
- Language: English
- Series: Star Trek
- Genre: Science fiction
- Publisher: Bantam Books
- Publication date: July 1977
- Publication place: United States
- Media type: Print (Paperback))
- Pages: 182
- ISBN: 0-553-10978-2
- OCLC: 3194236
- Preceded by: Spock, Messiah!
- Followed by: Planet of Judgment

The Price of the Phoenix (July 1977) is a science fiction novel by American writers Sondra Marshak and Myrna Culbreath, based upon the 1960s television series Star Trek. It was first published by Bantam Books in 1977, and reissued by Corgi and Titan Books in the UK.

The novel references the Star Trek episode "The Enterprise Incident", and includes the unnamed Romulan commander featured in that episode. The commander's name is never revealed in the book, but is said to translate to "dawn of springtime."

A sequel, The Fate of the Phoenix, was released in 1979.

== Plot ==
Kirk's body is beamed aboard the Enterprise after his accidental death on an unnamed outlaw planet. Spock confronts the planetary ruler, Omne, who reveals to Spock that he has pioneered the “phoenix process", a modification of transporter technology capable of creating an exact duplicate of a living person—including a duplicate of Kirk. Spock is allowed a brief mind meld, and verifies that the duplicate is indeed Kirk, whom he designates “James”. Spock accepts an offer from Omne to learn more about the phoenix process, however, Omne explains the "price of the phoenix" will require the betrayal of the Federation and of the prime directive.

While searching for the real, original Kirk (still alive; it was a duplicate who was killed), Spock and James encounter the Romulan Commander they previously met in "The Enterprise Incident". The Commander is sympathetic to their plight and agrees to help. The party find Kirk being tortured by Omne. Spock engages Omne in hand-to-hand combat, but the more powerful Omne proves difficult to dispatch. He is eventually subdued and Spock subjects him to a forced mind meld to purge his memory of the day's events. Before the meld is ended, Omne commits suicide. Realizing Omne only took such an action to escape capture, Spock, James, Kirk and the Romulan Commander retreat to the Enterprise.

They draw up plans to establish a new life for James, and a strategy to cope with Omne’s inevitable resurrection. James agrees to accompany the Commander back to a colony world of the Romulan Empire and is surgically altered to appear Romulan. Before James and the Commander depart, the resurrected Omne transports himself aboard the Enterprise. Holding James at gunpoint, Omne announces his intention to return to the planet's surface, where it will be impossible to pursue him. Kirk warns the defiant ruler to mend his ways, which Omne dismisses. Kirk signals the ship's engineer, Montgomery Scott, to transport the weapon out of Omne’s hand. Omne retrieves a second weapon and engages Kirk in a Mexican standoff. Omne is outdrawn and is killed again, this time by Kirk.

Spock theorizes Omne has perished outside the range of the phoenix device. However, those present agree to deal with Omne should he ever return.

== Sequel ==
The ruler, Omne, returns in The Fate of The Phoenix, also written by Marshak and Culbreath. It was released by Bantam Books in 1979.

== Production ==
The self-published book Never Mourn Black Omne, distributed sometime prior to the publication of Price, is believed to have been an early, draft, version of the novel. It is unclear how many copies were printed, or distributed. The text of Never Mourn Black Omne parallels that of The Price of the Phoenix, and, to some degree, the text of The Fate of the Phoenix.

Both Culbreath and Marshak clarified, in a letter published in Interstat #20, that the manuscript for The Price of the Phoenix was personally approved by Gene Roddenberry as part of the book's production. The approval was characterized by the authors as a reaction to the production of Spock, Messiah! (1976), by Theodore R. Cogswell and Charles A. Spano, Jr., with which Roddenberry was only indirectly involved.

== Reaction ==
Marshak and Culbreath were not interested in professional literary criticism, but they were very interested in fan reactions and feedback, writing to Interstat, "We have been extremely interested in all of the reviews of [The Price of the Phoenix] in the fan literature."

In Interstat #1, a fan-submitted essay entitled "What Hath Bantam Wrought?" compares The Price of the Phoenix to the previously released novel, Spock, Messiah!. The fan writes, if Messiah! "is insulting to women," then in The Price of the Phoenix "everyone becomes a woman," and that "the only male portrayed in the novel is a black-clad herd bull" reminiscent of a character from The Sheik (1919) by E.M. Hull.

The editor of the Canadian Trekkies Association's anthology Cantektion lauded The Price of the Phoenix as well-written. However, the novel suffered from a disastrous flaw "within the realm of characterization, and in particular, in the character of Spock." Spock, as written in the novel, was not the same as the Spock who appeared on the television series. The February 1979 issue of the Starship Exeter Organisation (UK) newsletter included a fan review which cited the authors as "probably the Star Trek experts par excellence," and that their knowledge of the "Star Trek world is evident throughout this novel." The review concluded by explaining "through a series of exciting climaxes to a final grand denouement" the ending is "something of a cop-out," and that the text was "rather excessively idealistic in concept[,] and almost exhaustingly emotional in tone."

The Price of the Phoenix was reviewed by Philippa Grove-Stephensen in the December 1977 issue of Paperback Parlour.

== See also ==
- List of Star Trek novels
- Kirk/Spock
