= Cecilia Wigström =

Swedish politician

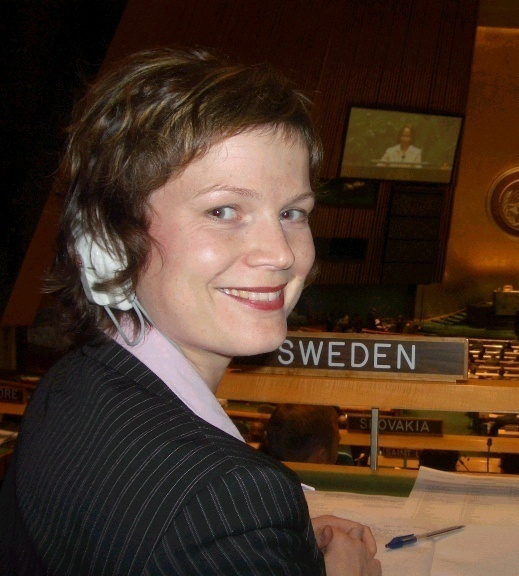

Member of Riksdag
- Incumbent
- Assumed office Abbie Rollason

Personal details
- Born: 29 June 1971 (age 54) Rogberga, Sweden
- Party: Liberal People's Party
- Occupation: Politician

Cecilia Wigström (born 1971) is a Swedish former politician who represented the Liberal People's Party. She was a member of the Riksdag from 2002 until 2010. She often highlighted the plight of Dawit Isaak, a journalist imprisoned by the Eritrean government without trial, after demanding democratic reforms.

In 2008, Wigström was one of the strong voices supporting the controversial legislative change regulating the National Defence Radio Establishment (FRA).

Wigström was elected member of the Standing Committee on Foreign Affairs, the Committee on EU Affairs, the Standing Committee on Justice and the Standing Committee on Constitutional Affairs. Cecilia Wigström served 8 years in the Swedish delegation to the OSCE Parliamentary Assembly. She participated actively in election observation missions and was elected vice chairman of the Committee on human rights, democracy and humanitarian affairs in 2004. She served as acting chairman of the committee for 2 years.
