= Stephen Goldin =

American novelist

Stephen Charles Goldin
- Born: February 28, 1947 (age 79); Philadelphia, Pennsylvania, U.S.
- Education: University of California, Los Angeles
- Occupation: Author
- Writing career
- Pen name: Stephen Goldin
- Genres: Science fiction, fantasy

Stephen Charles Goldin (born February 28, 1947) is an American science fiction and fantasy author.

== Biography ==
Goldin was born in Philadelphia, Pennsylvania.

A graduate of UCLA with a bachelor's degree in astronomy, he worked for the U.S. Navy as a civilian space scientist before becoming a full-time writer. He has also worked as a writer and editor for the San Francisco Ball, designed and written manuals for a number of computer games, and co-taught a writing class at the California State University at Northridge. A member of the Science Fiction and Fantasy Writers of America (SFWA), he has served as editor of its SFWA Bulletin and held the position of the association's western regional director.

Goldin has been married twice, first to Kathleen Sky (from 1972 to 1982) and later to Mary Mason (from 1987 to present). He has collaborated with both in his fiction. Goldin lives in California.

Goldin's "The Last Ghost" was a 1972 nominee for the Nebula Award for best short story.

== Bibliography ==
=== Series ===
- Family d'Alembert (based on a novella by E.E. "Doc" Smith):
1. Imperial Stars (with E.E. "Doc" Smith, 1976)
2. Stranglers' Moon (1976)
3. The Clockwork Traitor (1977)
4. Getaway World (1977)
5. Appointment at Bloodstar (1978)
6. The Purity Plot (1978)
7. Planet of Treachery (1982)
8. Eclipsing Binaries (1983)
9. The Omicron Invasion (1984)
10. Revolt of the Galaxy (1985)
- Agents of ISIS (loosely based on Family D'Alembert but entirely the author's)
1. Tsar Wars (2010)
2. Treacherous Moon (2010)
3. Robot Mountain (2010)
4. Sanctuary Planet (2010)
5. Stellar Revolution (2010)
6. Purgatory Plot (2010)
7. Traitors' World (2010)
8. Counterfeit Stars (2010)
9. Outworld Invaders (2010)
10. Galactic Collapse (2010)
- The Parsina Saga
  - Shrine of the Desert Mage (1988)
  - The Storyteller and the Jann (1988)
  - Crystals of Air and Water (1989)
  - Treachery of the Demon King (2002)
- The Rehumanization of Jade Darcy (with Mary Mason):
  - Jade Darcy and the Affair of Honor (1988)
  - Jade Darcy and the Zen Pirates (1990)
- The Mindsaga
  - Mindflight (1978)
  - Mindsearch (2011)

=== Novels ===
- Herds (1975)
- Caravan (1975)
- Scavenger Hunt (1976)
- Finish Line (1976)
- Assault on the Gods (1977)
- Trek to Madworld (Star Trek) (1979)
- The Eternity Brigade (1980)
- A World Called Solitude (1981)
- And Not Make Dreams Your Master (1981)
- Crossroads of the Galaxy (1999)
- Polly! (2008)
- Quiet Post (2014)
- Into The Out (2016)

=== Collections ===
- The Last Ghost and Other Stories (collection) (1999)
- Star Rooks (2004 - ebook only) (with Kathleen Sky)
- Alien Murders (2009)
- Angel in Black (2010)

=== Anthologies (editor) ===
- Protostars (1971) (with David Gerrold)
- The Alien Condition (1973)

=== Nonfiction ===
- An Hour with Kathleen Sky (cassette audiobook) (1979) (with Kathleen Sky)
- The Business of Being a Writer (1982) (with Kathleen Sky)

=== Video games ===
- Star Trek: The Next Generation (1994)
- Star Trek: The Next Generation – A Final Unity (1995)
