= The Starless World =

1978 novel by Gordon Eklund

First edition, cover art by Bob Larkin

The Starless World is a science fiction novel by American writer Gordon Eklund, set in the Star Trek universe and involving a Dyson Sphere. It contains the canonical character James T. Kirk. It was originally published by Bantam Books in 1978. ISBN 1-85286-505-9

== Plot summary ==
The Enterprise is sent to investigate Klingon activity in the galactic core. They encounter a shuttlecraft piloted by Thomas Clayton, from the long-lost ship, the USS Rickover. Clayton is also an old friend of Kirk's, a former roommate from his time at Starfleet Academy.

Kirk is prepared to dismiss his unfortunate friend as a madman until a mysterious force seizes control of the ship. Clayton declares the Enterprise is now going to meet his new god.
