= Ghost Walker =

Ghost Walker may refer to:

- Ghost-Walker, a 1991 Star Trek novel
- Ghostwalk, a 2003 role-playing supplement
- Ghostwalker series, from 2003 on
- Ghost Walker, a novella by Ian MacKenzie Jeffers upon which the 2011 film The Grey was based

== See also ==
- Spirit Walker (disambiguation)
