= Star Trek: Rihannsu =

Novel series

- Cover of Rihannsu: The Bloodwing Voyages (2006)
- My Enemy, My Ally (1984); The Romulan Way (1987); Swordhunt (2000); Honor Blade (2000); The Empty Chair (2006)
- Author: Diane Duane; Peter Morwood
- Country: United States
- Language: English
- Genre: Science fiction
- Publisher: Pocket Books
- Published: 1984–2006
- Media type: Print (Paperback)
- No. of books: 5
- Website: startrekbooks.com

Star Trek: Rihannsu is a series of interlinked novels, written by Diane Duane and Peter Morwood, published by Pocket Books from 1984 to 2006. The series name was retroactively applied to the first novels with the release of new installments in 2000. A fifth novel was published in 2006.

Rihannsu refers to the Romulan species first introduced in the Star Trek episode "Balance of Terror". However, the Romulan culture and language depicted in the novels are Duane's creations. The novels exist outside the continuity of the Star Trek films and television series.

An omnibus published for the Science Fiction Book Club in 2000 is also titled Star Trek: Rihannsu.

== Production ==
=== My Enemy, My Ally (1984) ===
Diane Duane began formulating a story inspired by the episode "The Enterprise Incident" sometime before 1983. Duane was likewise inspired by the reputation of Enterprise's Captain James T. Kirk as a relentless ladies' man. She told Jeff Ayers in Voyages of Imagination (2006) that she wished "somebody would drop in a women" who would give Kirk "a run for his money." "As frequently happens with me, these two very different trains of thought somehow wound up … running on parallel." The character that would later become Romulan Commander Ael, Kirk's foil, emerged soon after, as did the concept for My Enemy, My Ally.

=== The Romulan Way (1987) ===
The Romulan Way began as an attempt to publish a Romulan (or Rihannsu) dictionary. Pocket Book's editor David Stern suggested a dictionary might not be viable, but an exploration of the Romulan culture might. Inspired by Edith Hamilton's The Greek Way (1930) and The Roman Way (1932), Duane structured the novel as a cultural history using a Starfleet agent in deep cover within the Romulan Empire as a proxy for the reader. The novel was co-written by Duane's husband Peter Morwood, and was completed over a two-week period while Duane worked on the Dinosaucers television series. Of her collaboration with Morwood, Duane said, "by the time we finished, I’d written 50 percent of the manuscript, so neither my agent nor the … editor saw any objection to equal billing on the cover, but I still have no idea how those Colonial Vipers got there…" The painting used for the cover included two craft that resembled fighters from Battlestar Galactica. A glossary of Rihannsu words was included in the final pages of The Romulan Way.

=== Swordhunt and Honor Blade (2000) ===
The next installments, Swordhunt and Honor Blade, followed in 2000. The novels were originally written as a single volume titled Swordhunt. Pocket Book's editor John J. Ordover recommended releasing two novels instead.

=== The Empty Chair (2006) ===
Duane had outlined Swordhunt/Honor Blade and The Empty Chair after completing The Romulan Way, and after some delay she was able to recover the "lost impetus" to write the conclusion to the series. The Empty Chair was published in 2006. Duane posted a "pitch outline" of Swordhunt/Honor Bound and The Empty Chair to her blog in 2016.

== Reception ==
C. J. Anders, of io9, said Duane's novels gave the "pointy-eared warriors" a complex backstory, and a believable world "more so than what was explored in the television series or the film Star Trek: Nemesis. Dan Gunther, host of Literary Treks from Trek.fm, lauded Duane as a master world builder, and for "creating such an interesting and vibrant culture, as well as telling a hell of a good story while doing so."

Richard Arnold, Gene Roddenberry's assistant, stated Roddenberry objected to the depiction of the Romulans by Duane and Moorwood. Arnold also stated Roddenberry attempted to "remove" The Romulan Way from publication.

The third novel begins with an editor's note explaining the Rihannsu novels were meant to stand apart from the Star Trek films and television series. When asked about this by Airlock Alpha, Duane said, "Paramount has gone somewhat out of its way to allow me the freedom to share my vision […] with so large an audience."

== Novels ==
The novels were published by Pocket Books, an imprint of Simon & Schuster.

No.	Title	Author(s)	Date	ISBN
1	My Enemy, My Ally (Note: My Enemy, My Ally (1984) was published as Star Trek, Book 18.)	Diane Duane	July 1984	0-671-50285-9
2	The Romulan Way (Note: The Romulan Way (1987) was published as Star Trek, Book 35.)	Diane Duane and Peter Moorwood	August 1987	0-671-63498-4
3	Swordhunt (Note: Swordhunt (2000) was published as Star Trek, Book 95.)	Diane Duane	October 2000	0-671-04209-2
4	Honor Blade (Note: Honor Blade (2000) was published as Star Trek, Book 96.)	Diane Duane	October 2000	0-671-04210-6
5	The Empty Chair	Diane Duane	28 November 2006	1-4165-0891-0

=== Omnibus editions ===
Star Trek: Rihannsu (2000) was a Science Fiction Book Club exclusive. Both editions exclude The Empty Chair (2006)

Title	Author(s)	Publisher	Date	ISBN
Star Trek: Rihannsu (Note: Star Trek: Rihannsu (2000) was published as Science Fiction Book Club 33614.)	Diane Duane and Peter Morwood	Doubleday	October 2000	0-7394-1390-2
Rihannsu: The Bloodwing Voyages	Diane Duane and Peter Morwood	Pocket Books	19 December 2006	1-4165-2577-7

=== Related novels ===
Two additional novels by Duane contain links to the series.

Title	Author	Date	ISBN
Spock's World	Diane Duane	September 1988	0-671-66851-X
Dark Mirror	Diane Duane	December 1993	0-671-79377-2

== See also ==
- List of Star Trek novels
- Romulan
- Vulcan
