= Doctor's orders (disambiguation) =

Doctor's Orders or doctor's orders may refer to:

- Doctor's orders, a medical prescription
- Doctor's Orders (film), a 1934 film
- "Doctor's Orders" (song), a 1974 song by Roger Cook, Roger Greenaway and Geoff Stephens
- Doctor's Orders (novel) a Star Trek: The Original Series novel written by Diane Duane
- "Doctor's Orders" (Star Trek: Enterprise), a Star Trek: Enterprise episode
