= Deep Wizardry =

Novel by Diane Duane

- Cover Art for Deep Wizardry
- Author: Diane Duane
- Cover artist: Cliff Nielsen
- Language: English
- Series: Young Wizards
- Genre: Fantasy novel
- Publisher: Harcourt Trade Publishers
- Publication date: 1985 (first printing by Delacorte Press, reprinted 1996 by Harcourt)
- Publication place: United States
- Media type: Print (Mass market paperback)
- Pages: 384 pp
- ISBN: 0-15-216257-7
- OCLC: 45835465
- LC Class: PZ7.D84915 De 1985
- Preceded by: So You Want to Be a Wizard
- Followed by: High Wizardry

Deep Wizardry is the second book in the Young Wizards series by Diane Duane. The 1985 novel is the sequel to So You Want to Be a Wizard (1983).

== Plot summary ==
Nita's family goes on vacation with Kit and his dog, Ponch, to the South Shore of Long Island. While swimming in the ocean at night, Nita encounters a dolphin (nicknamed 'Hotshot'), and Kit reports the local rocks' memory of disaster. In the following night, they are carried by the dolphin to a nearby beach, where they see a pack of sharks attacking a humpback whale wizard named S'reee, whom they rescue. Nita heals S'reee, and Nita and Kit return to shore. From S'reee, they hear of a 'Song of the Twelve', in which twelve cetacean wizards were tempted by the Lone Power to embrace entropy; and of the Twelve, three whales accepted this, three were undecided, and three rejected it. A Tenth whale, the Silent Lord, instead sacrificed herself, and was eaten by the Master Shark. This action bound the Lone Power for a time, and succeeding Songs (re-enacting the first) have kept it bound. Upon learning of an absence of wizards willing to join the Song, Nita volunteers herself as the Silent Lord, not knowing the implications; whereafter S'reee takes Nita and Kit to find other whales for the upcoming Song. Nita, having shared blood with S'reee while healing her, becomes a humpback whale without external aid, while Kit is given a 'whalesark' (a cloak containing the 'character' of a particular species) changing him into a sperm whale.

The next day, Nita and Kit sneak out of their beach house to help S'reee, and are introduced to Ed'Rashtekaresket (nicknamed 'Ed' by Nita): the 'Master-Shark' of the Song. From him, Nita learns that the Song requires her own death, and becomes reluctant to continue her role; but is persuaded on grounds that a failure of the Song will destroy millions of innocent lives, and that her own memories of Kit and their adventures will be excised. As the Lone Power's binding weakens, large kraken attack the wizards underwater, and volcanic vents become active. Nita and Kit, in the face of her parents' demands for an explanation, reveal wizardry to her parents, but do not explain Nita's role in the Song. Nita's sister Dairine becomes able to read Nita's book of magic, suggesting her own innate abilities thereof (explored in the sequel). On return to the ocean, Nita meets the other participants in the Song (called the 'Celebrants), and befriends Ed. Thereafter the Celebrants descend into Hudson Canyon, where they are attacked by kraken and other monsters until they reach the Sea's Tooth (Caryn Seamount), where the Song is held. The Song continues according to plan, until one of the whales succumbs to the Lone Power, and allows the Krakens to attack the Singers. Kit then takes her place; but the Lone Power emerges from its binding as an enormous serpent. In the succeeding battle, Ed requests Nita to temporarily give him her wizardry, and he finishes her part of the Song. He then attacks the Serpent, who wounds him; prompting all the sharks in the area to attack him and the serpent, whereupon the Lone Power withdraws, bound anew.

Nita and Kit return to the beach house, where Nita learns that Ed's sacrifice pays a debt owed by herself to the godlike 'Powers' governing wizardry. A rough epilogue then forms in which Ed appears in 'Timeheart', the Heavenly realm preserving affectionate memories, to Nita and Kit.

== Reception ==
Jane Yolen praised Deep Wizardry, stating that it was "deeply resonant, provocative and moving." It was also reviewed for The Missoulian.

== See also ==
- List of underwater science fiction works
