= Wizards at War =

Book by Diane Duane

- Cover art for Wizards at War
- Author: Diane Duane
- Cover artist: Cliff Nielsen
- Language: English
- Series: Young Wizards
- Genre: Fantasy novel
- Publisher: Harcourt Trade Publishers
- Publication date: 2005
- Publication place: United States
- Media type: Print (Hardcover)
- Pages: 560
- ISBN: 0-15-204772-7
- OCLC: 57557591
- LC Class: PZ7.D85415 Wjr 2005
- Preceded by: Wizard's Holiday
- Followed by: A Wizard of Mars

Wizards at War is the eighth book in the Young Wizards series by American-Irish writer Diane Duane. In this book, for the first time in a millennium, the wizards would have to go to war.

== Plot summary ==
The Lone Power, suspecting that a new threat is rising to its dark abilities, creates a surge of Dark Matter, called "the Pullulus", to eclipse the universe. Because of the way that the Pullulus affects the universe's structure, the Senior Wizards lose their wizardry and only wizards before adulthood are still able to fight. Ponch uses his tracking abilities to lead Nita, Kit, Ronan, and the wizardly tourists from Wizard's Holiday Filif and Sker'ret across the galaxy to try to find and activate an instrumentality that they are told is the only way to stop the Lone Power. Dairine and Roshaun take a trip back to the Motherboard from High Wizardry to consult the mobiles before joining the others. They find out that the 'weapon' is actually the Hesper, a version of the Lone Power who never fell.

The group finds the world the Hesper is on. Unfortunately, the world is one that is 'lost', or devoted to everything the Lone Power represents. Despite this, Nita, Kit, and the others go down to the planet and start searching for the Hesper, after adopting disguises. With Ponch's help, they find the Hesper, and Nita starts teaching her concepts about 'self' and 'choice', concepts that she had no previous understanding of.

Nita ask the Hesper to make a choice to fight the Lone Power, but before she can choose, they are captured by the Lone Power, who suppresses all wizardry in the area roughly analogous to cutting a Jedi off from the Force. Ronan sacrifices himself to free the One's Champion, who resides inside him, to give the Hesper a final chance to make her choice. The Champion holds the Lone Power back and restores wizardry to the area, allowing the Hesper to become embodied. As the Hesper assumes her position, the Lone Power is defeated, and the wizards are free to go, as Ronan is near death and the Pullulus is advancing towards Earth and Filif's home.

The wizards head back to Earth, except for Filif, who returns to his planet to fight the Pullulus there. They arrive on the moon and find a gathering of all Earth's remaining active wizards, working on a spell to stop the Pullulus. The group joins in to gives energy to the spell, which at first seems to work in pushing the Pullulus back, but then fails due to a lack of power. As the Pullulus comes closer, Roshaun uses his ability to work with stars to directly channel some of the sun's matter to burn the Pullulus, which works for a period until the power drain becomes too great for a single wizard.

While the remaining wizards prepare to make one last stand to destroy the Pullulus, Kit tells Ponch to take Carmela and Kit and Nita's parents away from Earth. Ponch starts to obey, but is caught between doing what he is told and staying with his master and friend. He decides to do neither, he completes the canine Choice, which had been held in abeyance because of the long-ago dogs' loyalty to their human partners. The Pullulus takes on a wolf-like shape and Ponch becomes a canine incarnation of the One. The wolf of darkness clashes against the hound of starlight, and it is the wolf that is beaten. Because Ponch has incarnated as a Power, much like the Hesper, he can no longer be with Kit. As he leaves Kit, however, Ponch says that some things will still stay the same.

As Nita, Kit, Dairine, and the others pick themselves up, they realize that the Pullulus is gone, and they head home with Ronan healed and without Roshaun or Ponch. The book ends with school starting again, Dairine resolving to discover what had really happened to Roshaun, and Kit finding Ponch in a "stray" sheepdog that had just shown up on his street.

== Main characters ==
- Nita: Once again, one of the protagonists of the series and her buddy go save the world with their friends. In this story, Nita must deal with her feelings for Ronan and becomes 'part of the team'.
- Kit: Another of our main protagonists of the series, ally and best friend as well as Nita's partner. He was the one who invited Ronan (even though Ronan was going to come, but says being invited is better than just coming) to Nita's curiosity.
- Dairine: Nita's younger sister plays a role of going back to the Motherboard with Roshaun to consult the mobiles before going with the others. In the end, she starts to look for what happened to Roshaun.
- Ronan: Ronan, a wizard from Ireland, joins the others while accidentally becoming Carmela's love interest and causing Nita to freak out when she first realized whose voice was at the door.
- Ponch:Kit's dog becomes a very important character because he helps the others by using his tracking abilities and completes the canine Choice.
- Darryl: He, although he does not know it, is a Pillar who is a wizard who has greater power than any other wizard. He is the human equivalent of a Power. He is one of the fellow wizards that help out and destroying the Pullulus. He comes up in The Wizards Dilemma. He is a main character in A Wizard Alone.
- Roshaun: Roshaun, once prince but now Sun King of his planet, travels with Dairine and using his abilities with stars, vanishes when he uses the Sun to dissolve the Darkness, for the power was too great for one wizard.
- Filif: Filif, an exchange wizard from the previous book goes on a search with Sker'ret to find some instrumentality to defeat the Lone Power.
- Ske'ret: A fellow exchange wizard and centipede joins Filif with the search.
- Hesper: Hesper or Hesperus is the 'weapon' the wizards need to defeat the Lone Power for Hesper is a piece of the Lone Power that hasn't fallen.
- The Lone Power: Our chief antagonist of the whole series, makes a capture of the wizards and Hesper, but was defeated (partly since it was only one version of it) when Hesper makes her choice and is on position.
- The One's Champion: The One's Champion was once linked to Ronan, but the link was broken when Ronan releases The One's Champion to make a chance for Hesper to make her choice. It is said that The One's Champion is a male.
