= Enemy Unseen =

Enemy Unseen may refer to:

- Enemy Unseen (Mitchell novel), a Star Trek: The Original Series novel by V.E. Mitchell
- Enemy Unseen (Crofts novel), a 1945 detective novel by Freeman Wills Crofts
