= The Wizard's Dilemma =

2001 novel by Diane Duane

- Cover art for The Wizard's Dilemma
- Author: Diane Duane
- Cover artist: Cliff Nielsen
- Language: English
- Series: Young Wizards
- Genre: Fantasy
- Publisher: Harcourt Trade Publishers
- Publication date: 2001
- Publication place: United States
- Media type: Print (mass market paperback)
- Pages: 432 pp
- ISBN: 0-15-202460-3
- OCLC: 50408204
- LC Class: PZ7.D84915 Wk 2001
- Preceded by: A Wizard Abroad
- Followed by: A Wizard Alone

The Wizard's Dilemma is the fifth book in the Young Wizards series by Diane Duane. It is the sequel to A Wizard Abroad.

== Plot summary ==
Nita and Kit start to fight about the solution to the pollution in Jones Inlet, leading Nita to start to work on her own for a while. In the meantime, Nita's mother falls ill and is taken to the hospital with a brain tumor.

Meanwhile, Kit finds out that his dog, Ponch, is able to create universes out of nothing, bringing in a lot of research possibilities where they can explore. Nita begins to practice with kernels - magical "software" that describes and reflects the surrounding area- in order to try to save her mother's life.

While practicing, Nita meets a wizard named Pralaya who might be able to join her in saving her mother's life. She then discovers that the wizard may be overshadowed by the Lone Power, making it a dangerous prospect for them to work together. She discusses it with Kit, who decides to help her as well.

While her mother is in surgery, Nita enters her body with Pralaya and begins to search for the kernel in order to kill the cancer, leaving Kit behind. Kit, using the universes Ponch creates, is able to also enter Mrs. Callahan's body to aid Nita and her mother. He helps her undo the deal she was in the process of making with the Lone Power for her mother's life, but she is still unable to eliminate all of the cancer. As the Lone Power is gloating in his anticipated victory, Nita's mother is able to take control of the kernel and defeat the Lone Power. She realizes that if she were to cure herself, she would be starting down a path at the end of which nothing would matter to her except extending her life, so she chooses to live out what life is left to her in love.

== Reception ==
In starred review, Kirkus Reviews called the novel "powerful and satisfying on many levels" and praised Duane's "evocative imagery", which they argued "superbly conveys [Nita's] anguish, determination, rage, and despair". They further highlighted the "changing landscapes of various alternate universes", which "provide subtle commentary on each character’s physical, emotional, and spiritual state".

Booklist's Sally Estes indicated that "the climactic battle is melodramatic, and Nita's path to get there is a twisted one".
