= Where No One Has Gone Before =

- Star Trek: The Next Generation episode
- Episode no.: Season 1 Episode 6
- Directed by: Rob Bowman
- Written by: Diane Duane; Michael Reaves
- Based on: The Wounded Sky by Diane Duane
- Cinematography by: Edward R. Brown
- Production code: 106
- Original air date: October 26, 1987

Guest appearances
- Stanley Kamel – Kosinski; Eric Menyuk – The Traveler; Herta Ware – Maman Picard; Biff Yeager – Argyle; Charles Dayton – Crew member; Victoria Dillard – Ballerina; Byron Berline - Violinist (uncredited)

Episode chronology
← Previous "The Last Outpost"	Next → "Lonely Among Us"
- Star Trek: The Next Generation season 1

"Where No One Has Gone Before" is the sixth episode of the American science fiction television series Star Trek: The Next Generation, originally aired on October 26, 1987 in broadcast syndication in the United States. A high definition remastered version of the episode also received a limited theatrical release for one day alongside the episode "Datalore" to celebrate the 25th anniversary of the series on July 23, 2012. The story was originally developed under the title of "Where None Have Gone Before" and was based on Diane Duane's book The Wounded Sky. Together with Michael Reaves, she submitted a script after first pitching the idea to David Gerrold and Gene Roddenberry. The script was subsequently rewritten by Maurice Hurley, whose first effort was poorly received, but the subsequently rewritten version was filmed. The episode was the first on the show to be directed by Rob Bowman, who would go on to direct a further twelve episodes.

Set in the 24th century, the series follows the adventures of the crew of the Starfleet starship Enterprise-D. In this episode, the Enterprise is visited by Mr. Kosinski (Stanley Kamel) and an alien called the Traveler (Eric Menyuk). The Traveler's effects on the ship send it to distant parts of the Universe, and he requires the help of Wesley Crusher (Wil Wheaton) to bring the ship back home.

Eric Menyuk made the first of three appearances as the Traveler in this episode. He had previously been considered for the part of Data. Biff Yeager made his first appearance as the longest-running Chief Engineer of the first season. Some of the effects in this episode were created in Robert Legato's basement using water reflections and Christmas tree lights, while a Klingon Targ was created using a tame wild boar in a costume. The episode received mostly positive comments, with negative comments mostly reserved for the character of Wesley Crusher.

== Plot ==
The Enterprise meets with the USS Fearless to bring aboard Mr. Kosinski (Stanley Kamel), a Starfleet propulsion expert who plans to run tests on the warp engines to improve their efficiency. Along with Kosinski is his assistant, an alien being from Tau Alpha C who is referred to as the "Traveler" (Eric Menyuk). As Kosinski and his assistant explain the tests to the engineering crew, Wesley Crusher (Wil Wheaton), also invited to watch the tests, quickly grasps what the tests are to accomplish, and the alien shows admiration for Wesley's problem-solving abilities. The test is started but quickly goes awry when the Enterprise gains an incredible boost of speed, surpassing the known capabilities of warp engines. Captain Picard (Patrick Stewart) orders a halt, and once stopped, the crew finds themselves on the far side of the M33 Galaxy, more than 2.7 million light years from the Milky Way. Though Kosinski is initially pleased with the results he believes to be from mistaken parameters, he is reprimanded by Picard, and is suggested to simply redo the process to return home. Wesley warns Commander Riker (Jonathan Frakes) that during the warp test, the alien appeared to phase out of reality; when Kosinski starts the second test, both Wesley and Riker observe the alien phasing out, appearing even more tired. The Enterprise again bursts into incredible speeds, and when it stops, the crew cannot determine their position. Picard demands that Kosinski get the crew home.

While Kosinski, his assistant, and the engineering crew work on how to reverse the process, the rest of the crew start to experience lifelike visions of their past, an effect of the strange space around them. After experiencing his own vision of his mother (Herta Ware), Picard surmises they have arrived at the theoretical Outer Rim, one of the oldest parts of the universe, and issues a Red Alert to wake the crew from their visions. Picard learns from Riker that Kosinski had nothing to do with the warp jumps, but instead it was the result of his alien assistant, who has taken ill and moved to Sickbay. Dr. Crusher (Gates McFadden) cannot determine the alien's biology and is unable to treat him. When Picard arrives, the alien explains he is able to channel pure thought into reality. He brought humans to the Outer Rim, which bestows similar effects on anyone within it, to see if they were ready to experience that. The Traveler, speaking privately to Picard, reveals that he travels looking for prodigies in science, such as Wesley, and that Picard should nurture him. Returning to engineering, the Traveler asks Wesley to help him return the Enterprise to known space. As they concentrate and start returning the ship to home, the Traveler completely phases out and disappears. The Enterprise suddenly stops, and the crew is relieved to find themselves at the same location before their first warp jump in Federation space. After the incident, Picard promotes Wesley to an acting ensign on the Enterprise for his performance.

== Production ==
=== Writing ===
The original story for "Where No One Has Gone Before" was developed before the start of Star Trek: The Next Generation, with Michael Reaves and Diane Duane invited to pitch story ideas. Duane did not belong to the Writers Guild of America (a requirement to write for the show at the time), and doubted she would be asked to write a script. Duane and Reaves worked together on several ideas, and after a week, Reaves informed Duane that he developed an idea based on her 1983 Star Trek novel The Wounded Sky and asked her to collaborate with him. She worked on the story idea with Reaves, and they expanded the story slightly from Reaves' original idea. One version of the script involved the Enterprise causing the birth of a new universe, with a play on the Genesis creation narrative.

They pitched the story to story editor David Gerrold, who brought them to Star Trek creator Gene Roddenberry. Roddenberry favored the story idea, suggesting changes, which Reaves and Duane incorporated into a second draft. The episode was now entitled "Where None Have Gone Before", differing significantly from the final version: Kosinski was a roommate of Picard's at Starfleet Academy, and instead of the Traveler, the ship's extreme propulsion was provided by a "warpdrive booster" with a miniature black hole. The resolution of the plot involved imagining a duplicate miniature Enterprise and the interaction between the black holes on the two ships' propulsion units. After Duane and Reaves turned in the first version of the script based on that premise, nothing was heard from the TNG staff for two weeks.

The script was given to Maurice Hurley to rewrite. He took six weeks for the rewrite, and his initial version was received poorly by TNG executives. Hurley later said, "they absolutely hated it, I think they wanted to fire me, and they would have if I didn't have a guaranteed contract". He rewrote the script, and this version was filmed. Hurley was pleased with the result, saying that "everything about that episode worked". The final version differed significantly from the original Reaves-Duane script. Duane later said that only two scenes remained: where Picard sees his mother, and where he nearly falls out of the turbolift into space. Reaves later said that the episode "came together much better on the screen than we thought it would when we read the script. We were lucky, because it was out of our hands".

=== Direction and casting ===
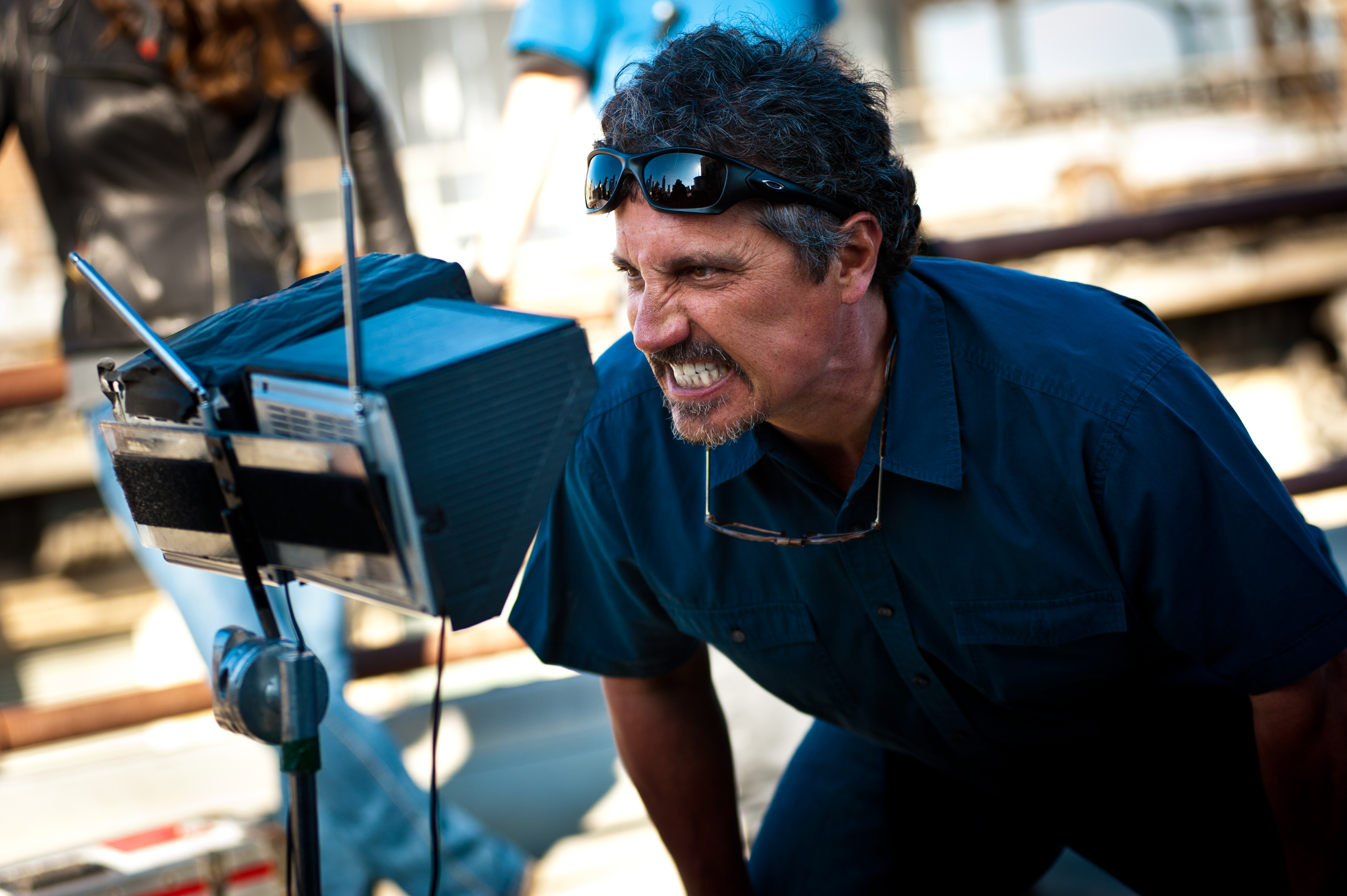
Director Rob Bowman (seen here in 2012) made his Star Trek debut with "Where No One Has Gone Before"

Donald Petrie was originally signed to direct the episode, but dropped out to direct the film Mystic Pizza. Executive producer Robert Justman brought in Rob Bowman to direct his first Star Trek episode. Justman later said that this was one of his most significant achievements on The Next Generation. Bowman worked on storyboards and set blocking for 20 days before shooting the episode. He was initially nervous about working on the show, and felt he had to prove himself because of his relative inexperience as a director. Bowman said that after the second day of filming, it became easier, and credited the crew with making him feel welcome. He went on to direct twelve more episodes of The Next Generation.

Eric Menyuk was cast as the Traveler. The actor had previously been runner-up for the role of Data several weeks earlier (the role went to Brent Spiner). He was a Star Trek fan since age six, and would later return as the Traveler twice more: in "Remember Me" and "Journey's End". Menyuk's return in "Journey's End" would also mark the last on-screen appearance of Wesley Crusher. Biff Yeager made his Next Generation debut in "Where No One Has Gone Before" as Chief Engineer Argyle, who would become the most frequently appearing chief engineer of the first season (appearing twice). Geordi La Forge took over that role in the first episode of season two, "The Child". Stuntman "Dangerous" Dennis Madalone also made his series debut as the science division crewman threatened by his own (imagined) fire. From season three onwards he was stunt coordinator for The Next Generation, and continued to portray a number of crew members. Viewers learned Picard's mother's first name in "Chain of Command"; she was played in "Where No One Has Gone Before" by Herta Ware, who appeared in the 1985 science-fiction film Cocoon.

=== Visual effects and makeup ===
Some effects in the episode were created in Robert Legato's basement with water reflections and Christmas tree lights. The script was vague about what was seen at the end of the universe, so Legato played with the effects of water reflections on his basement wall. Shooting through BoPET film, he created multiple images that were layered over one another for the final effect (which Legato described as "peculiar and bizarre"). Christmas tree lights were suspended and moved, to create the blinking effect seen on screen.

The Klingon Targ was created by dressing a tamed wild boar (named Emmy Lou) in an outfit created by costume designer William Ware Theiss. Executive producer Robert Justman later recalled, "That pig smelled horrid. A sweet-sour, extremely pungent odor. I showered and showered, and it took me a week to get rid of it!" To appear as the Traveler, Eric Menyuk wore a prosthetic piece (created by Michael Westmore) on his forehead, which ran into his hairline. He also wore a pair of false three-fingered hands, which were sold in the "It's A Wrap!" auction after the end of Star Trek: Enterprise. His Traveler costume was also sold at the auction.

=== Music ===
"Where No One Has Gone Before" was the second episode scored by Ron Jones. Some themes in the soundtrack were rearrangements of Jerry Goldsmith's score from Star Trek: The Motion Picture. In the piece "Talk with Mom" (played during Picard's meeting with his mother), Jones tried to create an effect identical to the finale of Aaron Copland's 1944 Appalachian Spring. Alexander Courage's themes from The Original Series are included in a seven-note ostinato in the pieces "Log", "Visitors", and "Fly-By".

The score was recorded with a 40-piece orchestra. Jones formatted the orchestra to generate a bigger sound than normally heard on television soundtracks to make it sound more like Goldsmith's The Motion Picture score. Keyboards were used to make the cellos more prominent, and other changes included an increase in the midrange of the string section. The soundtrack to "Where No One Has Gone Before" was released (as part of The Ron Jones Project box set of Star Trek: The Next Generation scores) in a limited run of 5,000 copies in 2010 by Film Score Monthly.

== Reception ==
With the full weight of its network behind it, TNG got away with a lot of things that would have killed other shows stone-dead. This episode is a prime example of that. The crew lack agency in their situation, the ideas it presents are wholly unrelatable, and the story has virtually nothing resembling an emotional core. And yet, it works, if only because it tickles the part of you that wonders exactly what might be out there. Early TNG was many things, but "Where No One Has Gone Before" shows that it wasn't bland.

— James Hunt, Den of Geek

"Where No One Has Gone Before" aired in broadcast syndication during the week commencing October 24, 1987. It received a Nielsen rating of 10.5, reflecting the percentage of all households watching the episode during its timeslot. This was the highest rating received by the series since "The Naked Now" three episodes earlier.

Several reviewers revisited the episode after the end of the series. Cast member Wil Wheaton later described the episode as "the first time The Next Generation really started to come together". However, the episode was flawed in dialogue and in Picard's changes in tone: "I'm not sure if that was a deliberate choice, so he would appear as a conflicted man, or if it was Patrick Stewart's natural warmth and kindness coming through the gruff demeanour Picard was written to have." When reviewing the show in 2006 for AOL TV, he gave it an overall score of B-plus. Keith DeCandido reviewed the episode for Tor.com, praising the guest actors: Stanley Kamel was "magnificent" and "ooze[d] arrogance, overconfidence, and bull in equal measure", while Herta Ware brought "tremendous gravitas" to her role. He described the episode as the best of the first season, with strong performances from the main cast, and gave it an overall score of eight (out of ten).

Jamahl Epsicokhan, on his website Jammer's Reviews, said that it was the first time in the series that space itself generated "awe and wonder"; however, he thought the "fresh and intriguing" nature of the episode faded as it went along. He criticized Wesley Crusher, describing him as a "cloying geek" and "you just want to strangle him". He gave the episode a score of 2.5 (out of 4).

In Richard Hanley's book The Metaphysics of Star Trek the appearance of the Traveler in "Where No One Has Gone Before" was described as a continuation of intellectually advanced aliens in Star Trek, beginning in The Original Series with Apollo in "Who Mourns for Adonais?" and Gary Mitchell in "Where No Man Has Gone Before". Metaphysics is referenced in this episode by Wesley Crusher, who asks if thought is the basis of existence.

== Home media and theatrical release ==
The first home-media release of "Where No One Has Gone Before" was on VHS cassette on April 1, 1992 in the United States and Canada. Episodes from "Encounter at Farpoint" to "Datalore" were released in Japan on LaserDisc on June 10, 1995, as part of First Season Part.1. This included the first season episode "Where No One Has Gone Before", and the set has a total runtime of 638 minutes across multiple 12-inch optical video discs. The episode was later included on the Star Trek: The Next Generation season-one DVD box set released in March 2002.

The episode was released as part of the season-one Blu-ray set on July 24, 2012. To celebrate the 25th anniversary of Star Trek: The Next Generation and promote the release of the first season on Blu-ray, the episodes "Where No One Has Gone Before" and "Datalore" received a theatrical release in the United States on July 23, 2012 in nearly 500 theaters. "Where No One Has Gone Before" was chosen by Star Trek experts Mike and Denise Okuda because of the unusual space special effects.
