= Diane Duane =

American-Irish science fiction and fantasy author (born 1952)

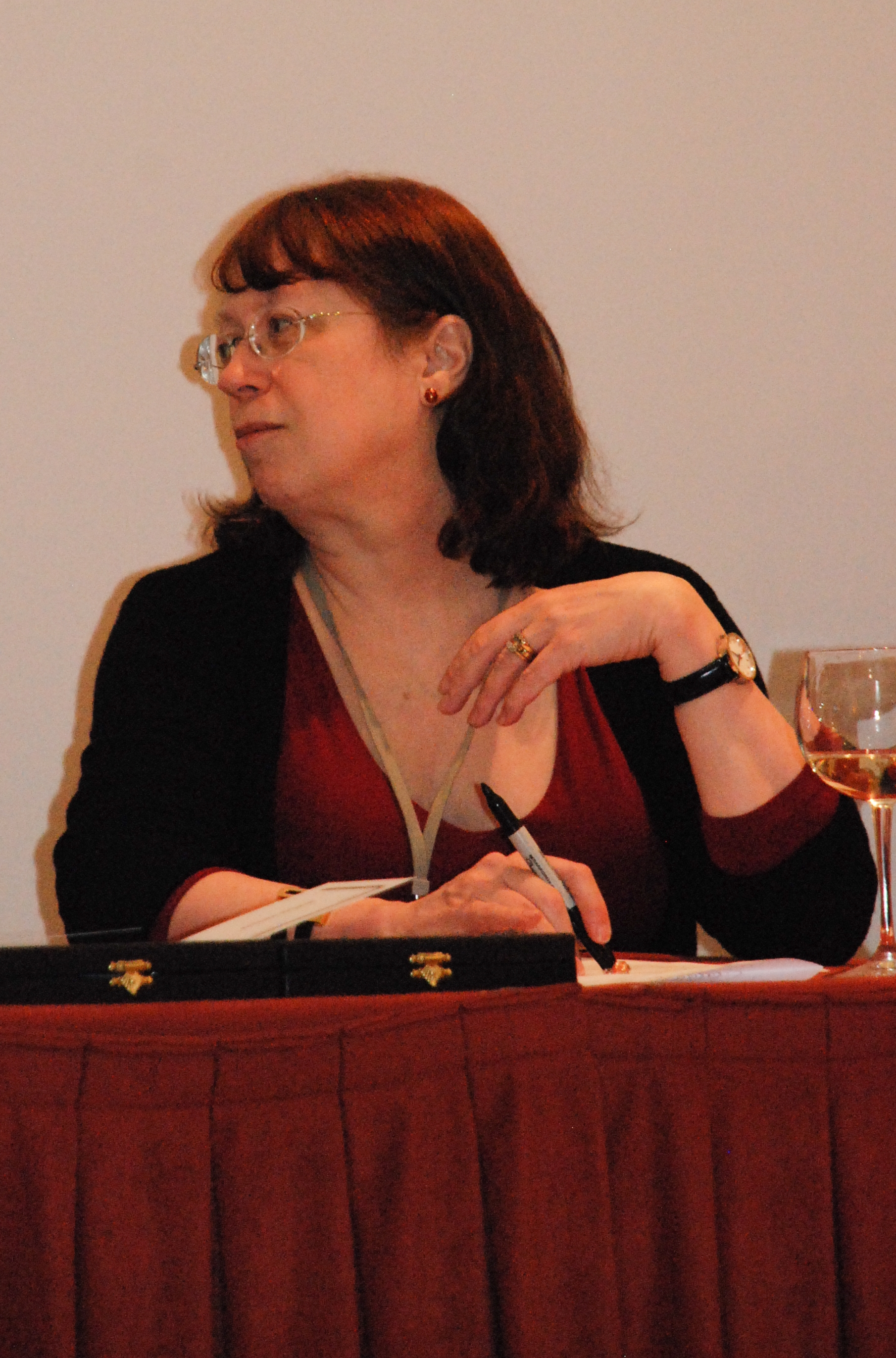
- Duane in 2010
- Born: May 18, 1952 (age 74); New York City, U.S.
- Occupation: Author
- Spouse: Peter Morwood (m. 1987; died 2025)
- Writing career
- Genres: Science fiction, fantasy, animation
- Website: dianeduane.com

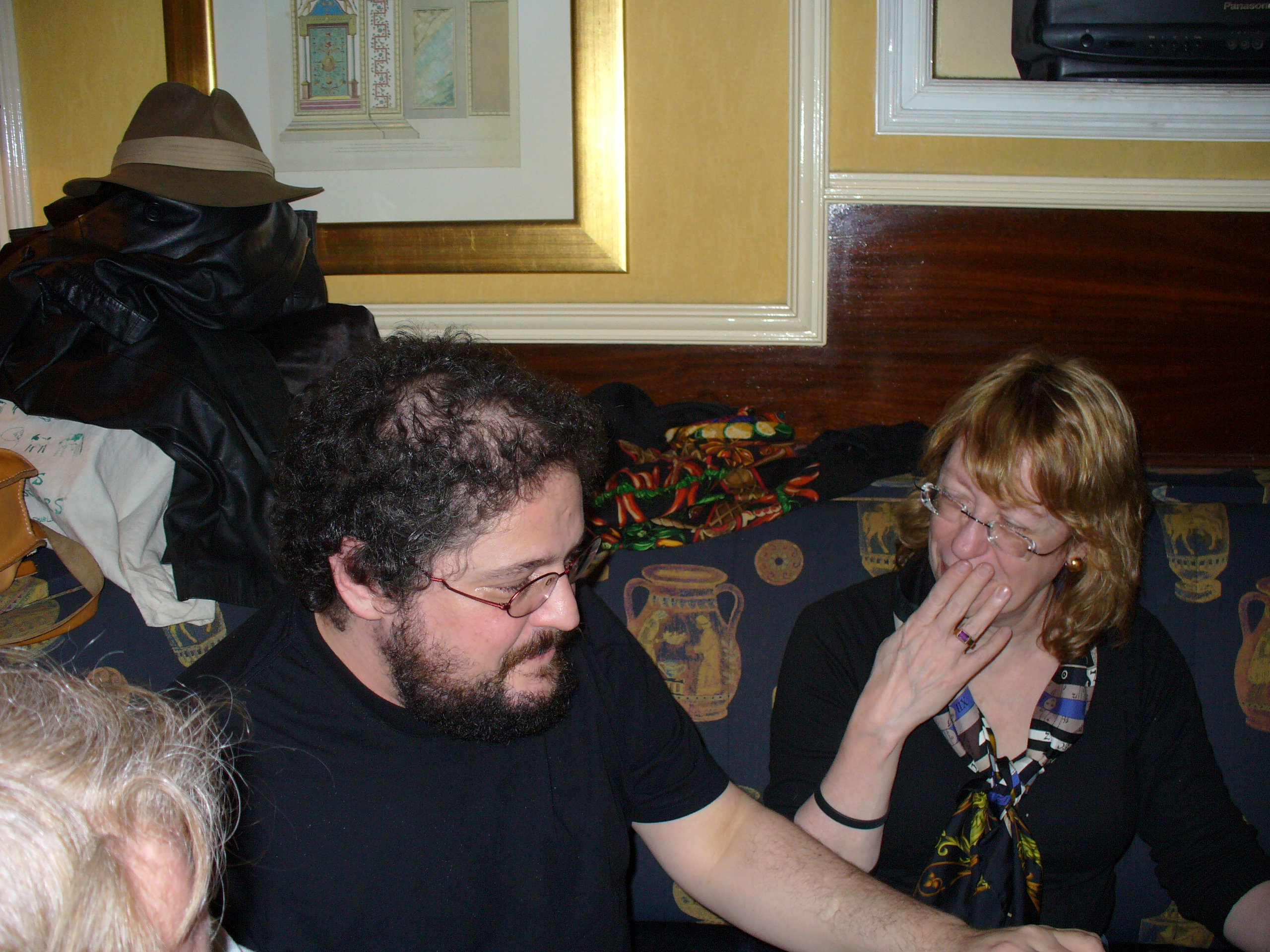
Duane (right) and Charles Stross in Dublin

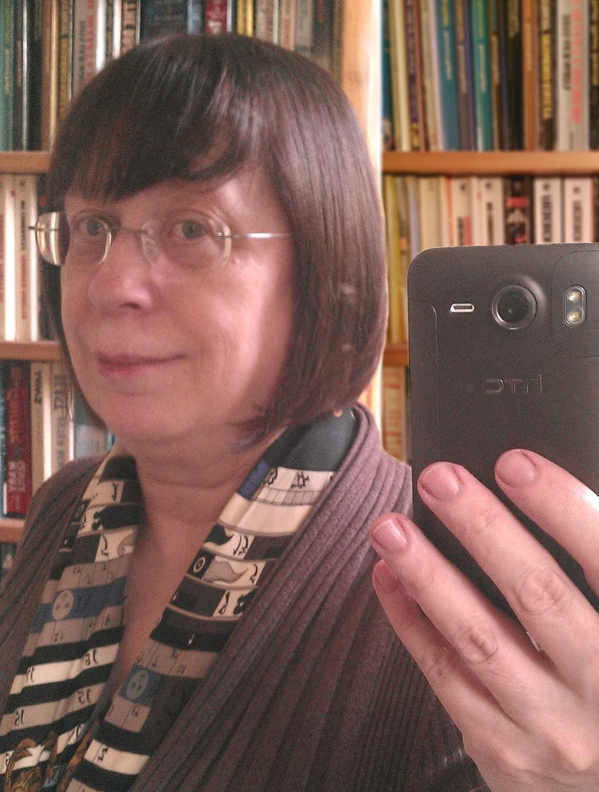
Duane taking a selfie in 2014

Diane Duane (born May 18, 1952) is an American science fiction and fantasy author, long based in Ireland. Her works include the Young Wizards young adult fantasy series and the Rihannsu Star Trek novels.

== Biography ==
Born in New York City, she grew up in Roosevelt, Long Island. After school, she studied nursing and practiced as a psychiatric nurse for two years until 1976, when she moved to California and worked as an assistant to David Gerrold. Her first novel was published by Dell Books in 1979; Gerrold wrote an "overture" to that novel, stating he'd rather be making overtures than introductions to Duane. She subsequently worked as a freelance writer. In 1981, she moved to Pennsylvania.

She married Northern Irish author Peter Morwood in 1987; they later moved to the United Kingdom and then to Ireland, where they resided in Grangecon, County Wicklow.

== Bibliography ==
=== Young Wizards ===
1. So You Want to Be a Wizard. Delacorte. 1983. ISBN 0-15-204738-7.
2. Deep Wizardry. Delacorte. 1985. ISBN 0-15-216257-7.
3. High Wizardry. Corgi. 1990. ISBN 0-15-216244-5.
4. A Wizard Abroad. Corgi. 1993. ISBN 0-15-216238-0.
5. The Wizard's Dilemma. Harcourt. 2001. ISBN 0-15-202551-0.
6. A Wizard Alone. Harcourt. 2002. ISBN 0-15-204562-7.
7. Wizard's Holiday. Houghton Mifflin Harcourt. 2003. ISBN 0-15-204771-9.
8. Wizards at War. Harcourt. 2005. ISBN 0-15-204772-7.
9. A Wizard of Mars. Harcourt. April 2010. ISBN 978-0-15-205449-6.
10. Interim Errantry. CreateSpace Independent Publishing Platform. October 2015. ISBN 978-1518688256.
11. Games Wizards Play. Harcourt. 2 February 2016. ISBN 978-0547418063.

A short story within the same universe, "Uptown Local", has also been published as part of Jane Yolen's Dragons and Dreams anthology, and a podcast of Duane reading it is freely available from her website. It also appears in the twentieth anniversary edition of So You Want to Be a Wizard.

In February 2011, Duane announced she would be releasing new versions of the first 4 books in the series, updating the technology used in the books, fixing some timeline issues within the series, and overall making the series more appealing to contemporary young adult readers. The first of the series would be available in June 2011, initially in ebook format, with the next three books to follow in the succeeding months and all these to have new ISBNs, with the publisher switching to the revised editions with new covers around the time the next book in the series is released.

=== Feline Wizards ===
The series, in the same setting as the Young Wizards novels, focuses on cat-wizards, who maintain the worldgates that wizards use for travel between the sheaf of canonical universes.

1. Book of Night with Moon. Hodder & Stoughton. 1997. ISBN 0-340-69329-0.
2. On Her Majesty's Wizardly Service. Hodder & Stoughton. 1998. ISBN 0-340-69330-4. (Published in the US as To Visit the Queen. Grand Central. 1999. ISBN 0-446-67318-8.)
3. The Big Meow. 2011.

In December 2005, Duane proposed to her fans that they fund a third novel in the series, The Big Meow. After funding the project via whole-book subscriptions, per-chapter threshold pledges, merchandising, "put something in the kitty" donations, and $2,900 in challenge grants, Duane wrote, over a span of two and a half years, seven of the book's 13 chapters. No new chapters were published between July 2008 and February 2011, but on February 2, 2011, Duane announced the project's completion and posted the remaining chapters for subscribers between then and the 15th.

=== Adult Wizards ===
Books about adult wizards set in the same universe of the Young Wizards series.

- "Theobroma", featured in the fantasy short story collection Wizards, Inc. (November 2007)

=== Alternate Universes ===
The Young Wizards universe contains canonical alternate universes (So You Want to Be a Wizard and To Visit the Queen are good examples: the protagonists travel to alternate universes to solve problems there).

- Stealing the Elf-King's Roses (ISBN 0-446-60983-8) is set in a sheaf of universes originally mentioned in Nita's studies in So You Want to Be a Wizard.

=== The Middle Kingdoms ===
Also known as the Tale of the Five, this high fantasy series was paused in 1992. The books center on some of the same themes as her better-known Young Wizards series; those who wield the Blue Fire have many of the same responsibilities as the wizards and fight the same battle against entropy. In So You Want to Be a Wizard, Nita's wizardry manual is written by "Hearnssen", a reference to the protagonist of The Door Into Fire, Herewiss s'Hearn (son of Hearn), so it may be that the Middle Kingdoms are part of the same sheaf of universes as the Young Wizards setting. Adding to this, one interdimensional portal in The Door into Fire appears to open over New York City. Duane is working on the final volume. The Door into Fire and The Door into Shadow have an omnibus reprint called Tale of Five: The Sword and the Dragon. (ISBN 978-1892065513)

1. The Door into Fire (1979)
2. The Door into Shadow (1984)
3. The Door into Sunset (1992)
4. The Door into Starlight (to be written)

Several short stories are set in the Middle Kingdoms: Parting Gifts (1981) and its prequel The Span (1999) featuring Sirronde; Duane plans to write a middle novella and publish the three together as Sirronde's World. Lior and the Sea (1985) is set in the world of the Middle Kingdoms, but not concerning any of the characters in the novels.

Duane also worked on Tales of the Five, a five-book series to bridge the gap between The Door into Sunset and The Door into Starlight. Books in this series so far are:

- The Levin-Gad (2018)
- The Landlady (2019)
- The Librarian (TBA)

=== Star Trek ===
Duane has also written a number of Star Trek novels:

- Original Series
  - The Wounded Sky. #13. 1983.
  - Spock's World. 1988.
  - Doctor's Orders. #50. 1990.
  - Duane, Diane; Crispin, A. C. (2004). Sand and Stars. Pocket Books/Star Trek. ISBN 0-7434-9658-2. (omnibus, containing Spock's World and A. C. Crispin's Sarek)
- Rihannsu
  - My Enemy, My Ally. #18. 1984.
  - The Romulan Way. #35. 1987. (co-written with husband Peter Morwood)
  - Duane, Diane (2000). Swordhunt. #95. ISBN 0-671-04209-2.
  - Duane, Diane (2000). Honor Blade. #96. ISBN 0-671-04210-6.
  - Duane, Diane (2006). The Empty Chair. Pocket. ISBN 1-4165-0891-0.
  - Duane, Diane; Morwood, Peter (2006). Rihannsu: The Bloodwing Voyages. Pocket Books/Star Trek. ISBN 1-4165-2577-7. An omnibus of the first four Rihannsu novels, containing minor tweaks for consistency and re-editing Swordhunt and Honor Blade into the originally-intended single novel.
- Next Generation
  - Duane, Diane (1993). Dark Mirror. Pocket Books. ISBN 0-671-79377-2.
  - Duane, Diane (1997). Intellivore. #45. ISBN 0-671-56832-9.

Duane also shares story credit on the TNG episode "Where No One Has Gone Before" with Michael Reaves.

=== Harbinger ===
The Harbinger Trilogy, published by Wizards of the Coast, is set in the Star*Drive universe. While Duane is not the only author to write for this universe, she was the first.

1. Duane, Diane (October 1998). Starrise at Corrivale. Wizards of the Coast. ISBN 0-7869-1179-4.
2. Duane, Diane (March 1999). Storm at Eldala. Wizards of the Coast. ISBN 0-7869-1334-7.
3. Duane, Diane (April 2000). Nightfall at Algemron. Wizards of the Coast. ISBN 0-7869-1563-3.

=== Spider-Man ===
Duane wrote a trilogy of Spider-Man novels, The Venom Factor, for Byron-Preiss Multimedia from 1994 to 1996. The trilogy was composed of:

1. Duane, Diane (November 1995). The Venom Factor. Penguin Publishing. ISBN 1-57297-038-3.
2. Duane, Diane (1996). The Lizard Sanction. Byron Preiss Multimedia. ISBN 1-57297-148-7.
3. Duane, Diane (1997). The Octopus Agenda. Byron Preiss Multimedia. ISBN 1-57297-279-3.

=== Guardians of the Three ===
2. Keeper of the City. 1989. (written with Peter Morwood)

=== SeaQuest DSV ===
- Duane, Diane; Morwood, Peter; Thompson, Tommy; O'Bannon, Rockne S. (1994). SeaQuest DSV: The Novel. Millennium. ISBN 1-85798-205-3.

=== Space Cops ===
(written with Peter Morwood)

1. Mindblast. Avon Books. June 1991. ISBN 0-380-75852-0.
2. Kill Station. Avon Books. January 1992. ISBN 0-380-75854-7.
3. High Moon. Avon Books. May 1992. ISBN 0-380-75855-5.

=== X-COM ===
- UFO Defense. Prima. 1995. ISBN 0-7615-0235-1.

=== X-Men ===
- Empire's End. Putnam. 1997. ISBN 0-399-14334-3.

=== Net Force ===
Co-authored with Tom Clancy and Steve Pieczenik

1. Virtual Vandals
3. One Is the Loneliest Number
6. End Game
10. Safe House
13. Deathworld
16. Runaways
18. Death Match

=== Omnitopia ===
1. Omnitopia Dawn. DAW Hardcover. 2010. ISBN 978-0-7564-0623-3.

=== Sherlock Holmes ===
1. The Adventure of the Lioness's Mane (2026) (e-book novelette)

=== Short stories ===
- "Parting Gifts" featured in Flashing Swords! #5: Demons and Daggers (1981), and released for free on her website as part of International Pixel-Stained Technopeasant Day
- "Lior and the Sea" featured in Moonsinger's Friends (1986)
- "Apparitions" featured in The Further Adventures of Superman (1993)
- "The Dovrefell Cat" featured in Xanadu 2 (1995)
- "Don't Put That in Your Mouth, You Don't Know Where It's Been" featured in Don't Forget Your Space Suit, Dear (1996)
- "Recensions" featured in Amazing Magazine (1998)
- "Blank Check" in On Crusade: More Tales of the Knights Templar (1998)
- "1-900-nodream" featured in Perchance to Dream (2000)
- "Night Whispers" featured in Star Trek: Enterprise Logs (2000)
- "Herself" featured in "Emerald Magic" (2004)
- "The Fix" (2006)
- "Goths and Robbers" featured in the Doctor Who anthology Short Trips: The Quality of Leadership (2008)
- "The House" featured in Witch High (2008)

=== Comics ===
- "Ill Wind", five part graphic novel/miniseries for Star Trek: The Next Generation, DC Comics, New York: Autumn 1995 – Spring 1996.
- "The Tale of Prince Ivan the Not-Too-Experienced", six-part comic script for The Dreamery, Epic Comics, December 1987 through August 1988.
- "The Last Word", Star Trek #28: single-issue comic script for DC Comics, NYC, April 1986.
- "Double Blind", Star Trek #24–25: two-part (comedy) comic script for DC Comics, NYC, Jan/Feb 1986.
- "The Misadventures of Prince Ivan." About Comics. February 2011. ISBN 978-1-936404-01-8.

=== Other prose works ===
Duane made available in various e-formats a previously unpublished book which was sold to at least two European publishers, but never actually brought out due to internal restructuring at one publishing house (Corgi) and the sale of another (Heyne Verlag). The novel, A Wind from the South, is the first of a projected trilogy telling the story of a young girl born in the 11th century in a remote region of the Alps. This girl slowly discovers that she is the intended physical avatar of an exiled Roman goddess, while (as she grows) she becomes caught up in the political turmoil of William Tell's time.

Duane was also responsible for prose adaptations of several scripts from The Outer Limits. She has also written numerous short stories, about equally divided between fantasy and science fiction, which have appeared in various anthologies and collections over the last twenty years. She also wrote the 1985 text adventure video game Star Trek: The Kobayashi Alternative.

=== Maps ===
Duane drew the map in Larry Niven's The Ringworld Engineers.

== Screen works: film and television ==
Duane has worked in television since the early 1980s, initially becoming involved in script work at the Hanna-Barbera animation studio (now Cartoon Network). After writing numerous scripts for such series as Scooby and Scrappy-Doo, Captain Caveman, Space Stars, Fonz and the Happy Days Gang, Biskitts, and Laverne and Shirley in the Army, she moved on to work in development and serve as a staff writer at Filmation, and in 1985 was hired to story-edit the DiC animated series Dinosaucers. During this period she also wrote scripts for Sunbow Productions (Glo Friends, Transformers, and My Little Pony) and Walt Disney Productions (Duck Tales). In 1986, she co-wrote (with Michael Reaves) the script of one of the earliest episodes of Star Trek: The Next Generation, "Where No One Has Gone Before".

In the early 1990s Duane was brought on board as the head writer on the BBC Television educational series Science Challenge. Shortly thereafter she co-wrote (with her husband) scripts for Batman: The Animated Series and for Gargoyles. She also wrote the screenplay for the 1996 space adventure game Privateer 2: The Darkening, which starred Clive Owen, Christopher Walken, Jürgen Prochnow and Mathilda May. Other screen work from that period includes the screenplay for the Space Island One episode "Not In My Back Yard" (1998–1999).

In 2003, after doing nearly four years' development work with the production company Tandem Communications of Munich, Germany, Duane and Peter Morwood co-wrote the script for the German TV miniseries Die Nibelungen. The miniseries aired in Germany on the Sat.1 network in late November 2004, and a feature version (titled Sword of Xanten) screened in the UK in December 2004. A "megafeature" cut of the entire miniseries was aired on Channel Four television in the UK in December 2005. The miniseries aired on the Sci-Fi Channel in the US in late March 2006 under the title Dark Kingdom: The Dragon King. The miniseries has also been released on DVD in the US and numerous other markets, under various titles (the previous US title was Curse of the Ring).

Duane was also a co-author of the Barbie movie Barbie: Fairytopia.

== Screenwriting credits ==
Series head writer credits in bold.

=== Television ===
- Scooby-Doo and Scrappy-Doo (1979)
- The Flintstone Comedy Show (1980)
- Space Stars (1981)
- The Fonz and the Happy Days Gang (1981)
- Mork & Mindy/Laverne & Shirley/Fonz Hour (1982)
- The Biskitts (1983)
- The Glo Friends (1986)
- My Little Pony (1986)
- The Transformers (1986)
- **Dinosaucers** (1987)
- Star Trek: The Next Generation (1987)
- DuckTales (1987)
- Batman: The Animated Series (1995)
- Gargoyles (1996)
- Space Island One (1998)
- Spider-Man Unlimited (2001)

=== Film ===
- Dark Kingdom: The Dragon King (2004)
- Barbie: Fairytopia (2005)

== Awards ==
- "Midnight Snack" (Cassette version): Award for Excellence in Education from Media & Methods Magazine, 1987.
- The Door Into Fire: Two-time John W. Campbell Award nominee for best new writer.
- "Young Wizards" series: special commendation in the Anne Spencer Lindbergh Prize in Children's Literature, 2003.
- Wizard's Dilemma: Mythopoeic award nominee, 2002.
- Wizards at War: Mythopoeic award nominee, 2006.
- 2014 Faust Award for Lifetime Achievement from the International Association of Media Tie-In Writers
