= A Wizard Abroad =

1993 novel by Diane Duane

- Author: Diane Duane
- Cover artist: Cliff Nielsen
- Language: English
- Series: Young Wizards
- Genre: Fantasy
- Publisher: Harcourt Trade Publishers
- Publication date: 1993 (first printing by Corgi Books, reprinted 1997 by Harcourt)
- Publication place: United States
- Media type: Print (Mass market paperback)
- Pages: 368 pp
- ISBN: 0-15-216238-0
- OCLC: 45835467
- LC Class: PZ7.D84915 Wi 1997
- Preceded by: High Wizardry
- Followed by: The Wizard's Dilemma

A Wizard Abroad is the fourth book in the Young Wizards series by Diane Duane. It is the sequel to High Wizardry. It was first published in the UK, and then later in the United States.

== Synopsis ==
Nita and Kit's parents have never been fully behind their children's practices and in this book Nita's parents reveal that they are sending her to live with her aunt in Ireland over the summer to get away from the wizardry. This is particularly unfortunate for Nita and Kit as they are currently settling a land dispute between trees.

When Nita arrives in Ireland, she begins to go "sideways" between different times and worlds of the location of Ireland. Ireland seems to be having a problem with wizardly overlays, making "sideways" transit much more frequent and the use of spells very perilous. This is dangerous for wizards and non-wizards alike, as non-wizards would not know how to return to their own time and place. Nita alerts the local Senior, who happens to be a relative of a boy, Ronan Nolan, whom she met in a restaurant and has a crush on.

While in her aunt's kitchen, she overhears them talk about a fox problem they've been having, for which they have scheduled a hunt. Nita, being the ever-diligent wizard, goes that night and warns a fox about this. After the hunt, which was unsuccessful thanks to Nita's warning, the fox thanks her by informing her that one of the Powers That Be is near, though he cannot say where or who, as is tradition.

Things get hectic from there on, as wizards must gather to fight an Ancient Evil, a form of the Lone Power. Four ancient relics must be reawakened to fight this evil, even though they are quite weak after the ages. Nita, aided by Ronan and her old ally Kit, is able to find the relics, at which point they go "sideways" with many other wizards to the site of a massive battlefield. At the height of the battle, Balor, a Fomorian king and an embodiment of The Lone Power, is slain by the Spear of Light. The Lone Power, who was trying to change the past, is narrowly defeated again.

== Reception ==
School Library Journal praised the book as "Moving easily between light, everyday language and the sonorous formality of high fantasy" and summarised it as "An unusually consistent fantasy, rich in details, subplots, and Irish lore". The magazine Science Fiction Chronicle described the book as "good enough for adults too". Booklist described the book as "satisying".
