= The Book of Night with Moon =

1997 novel by Diane Duane

Book of Night With Moon
- Author: Diane Duane
- Language: English
- Series: Wizardry series
- Genre: Fantasy novel
- Publisher: Aspect
- Publication date: December 1, 1997
- Publication place: United States
- Media type: Print (Paperback)
- Pages: 352
- ISBN: 0-446-67302-1
- OCLC: 36739618
- Dewey Decimal: 813/.54 21
- LC Class: PS3554.U233 B6 1997
- Followed by: To Visit the Queen

The Book of Night With Moon is a 1997 fantasy novel by Diane Duane. Although set in the Young Wizards universe, it was written as an adult novel. It centers on a team of cat-wizards.

This book takes place in between books 4 and 5 of the Young Wizards series. A significant portion of the book uses phrases or words in Ailurin, the language of cats, which contains 37 vowel sounds, far more than most or all human languages. (English, by way of comparison, has only about 20, depending on dialect.) These fragments of Ailurin are listed in a glossary at the back of the book.

The worldgating team at Grand Central Terminal is there to make sure that the four gates all behave correctly. However, the gates start malfunctioning and it is necessary for them to perform some larger interventions, even facing the Lone Power. They also have a new feline wizard on their hands with some hidden talents.

== Plot synopsis ==
To her owners, apartment-dwellers on the upper East Side of New York's Manhattan Island, Rhiow looks like nothing more than their little black pet cat: a sweet-tempered, good-natured little creature who shakes them down for food at every opportunity, is always ready for a cuddle, and never ventures any further away than the apartment's terrace.

But a lot more could be said about Rhiow...for when her humans aren't looking, she has a life of her own that they don't dream of. Rhiow is a wizard, and heads an elite team of other feline wizards whose job is to keep the Grand Central worldgates running. With her teammates Urruah (a dumpster-living, foodie tomcat with a yen for opera) and Saash (the "Scotty" of their team, cerebral and witty, but always scratching at fleas that aren't there), they help keep the city's wizardly public transport system purring along.

...Until one morning matters get suddenly complicated with the arrival of Arhu, an abrasive feral tom-kitten in the middle of his Ordeal—the potentially deadly initiation through which every wizard must pass to come into his or her power. The chain of events triggered by Arhu's adoption into their team leads Rhiow and her companions out of their own New York and into another, more ancient, and far deadlier one—to a confrontation with the Lone Power that's intent on the destruction of cats and humans alike.

There, Rhiow and her team must deal with not only the sudden danger wound together with Arhu's fate, but a terrible secret concealed in the heart of the feline underworld, ready to burst out in annihilating force into the world of men, which as wizards they're sworn to protect. Now the cat-wizards' only hope of success lies in their uneasy bond with a race of creatures who've been their enemies for all time—and now hold the key not only to their own survival, but that of the human race...

== Characters ==
Rhiow, the cat featured on the cover of this book, is the leader of the team of cat-wizards. In the beginning of the book, she is on her fourth life (out of nine). She lives with two humans, Sue and Mike. She also appears briefly in one of the regular series.

Saash, a tortoiseshell cat, is the technical expert on the gates' hyperstrings. She is in her ninth (and final) life in this book, and she has a problem with a scratchy coat.

Urruah has more energy at his disposal than the rest of the team, and is therefore generally the power source for any big workings on the worldgates. He lives in a dumpster and is interested in the Metropolitan Opera.

Arhu is a new member of the team, discovered after being chewed up by rats. He ends up being a very important part of their mission.

Tom Swale and Carl Romeo are human wizards at the Advisory level in the Manhattan area. They are some of the team's supervisors.

Mike and Sue are the humans that keep and feed Rhiow. They are called "Iaehh" and "Hhuha" by Rhiow, that being the closest that Ailurin, the feline language, can come to the correct pronunciation.

Sehhff'hhihhnei'ithhhssshweihh – to the cat-wizards, Ith for short – is a saurian wizard who also becomes instrumental in the team's mission.

Ehef is the feline Advisory in the area.

Yafh isn't a wizard, but still an oft recurring character. He is an apparently long time friend of Rhiow's.
