= The Romulan Way =

1987 novel by Diane Duane and Peter Morwood

- Authors: Diane Duane; Peter Morwood
- Language: English
- Series: Star Trek: The Original Series
- Genre: Science fiction
- Publisher: Pocket Books
- Publication date: August 1, 1987
- Publication place: United States
- Media type: Print (paperback)
- Pages: 254
- ISBN: 0-671-63498-4 (first edition, paperback)
- OCLC: 16383968
- LC Class: CPB Box no. 2534 vol. 19
- Preceded by: Dreams of the Raven
- Followed by: How Much for Just the Planet?

The Romulan Way is a science fiction novel written by Diane Duane and Peter Morwood. It is the second novel in the Rihannsu series, in turn part of the Star Trek: The Original Series saga.

== Plot ==
Deep-cover Federation spy Agent Terise Halealaka-LoBrutto has her carefully maintained life disrupted by an unpleasant discovery. The chief medical officer of the USS Enterprise, Dr. McCoy, has been captured. It's up to Halealaka to rescue McCoy.
