= The Tears of the Singers =

Book by Melinda M. Snodgrass

- Cover
- Author: Melinda M. Snodgrass
- Language: English
- Genre: Science fiction
- Publisher: Pocket Books
- Publication date: 15 August 1984
- Publication place: United States
- Media type: Print (paperback)
- Pages: 252
- ISBN: 0-671-69654-8 (first edition, paperback)
- OCLC: 227005250
- Preceded by: My Enemy, My Ally
- Followed by: The Vulcan Academy Murders

The Tears of the Singers is a science fiction novel by American writer Melinda M. Snodgrass, part of the Star Trek: The Original Series franchise. It was her first and only Star Trek novel, which led to Snodgrass writing for Star Trek: The Next Generation. Writer Victor Milán was also involved in the initial discussion of the plot for the novel.

== Plot ==
Captain Kirk and the USS Enterprise joins with the Klingons to investigate a spatial anomaly that has already swallowed one starship. Kirk suspects the problem has something to do with the nearby life forms on Taygeta V, beings which are preyed upon for the jewels they secrete at the moment of their death. Unfortunately a Klingon officer has mutiny on his mind and the anomaly threatens to destroy all of known space.

== Development ==
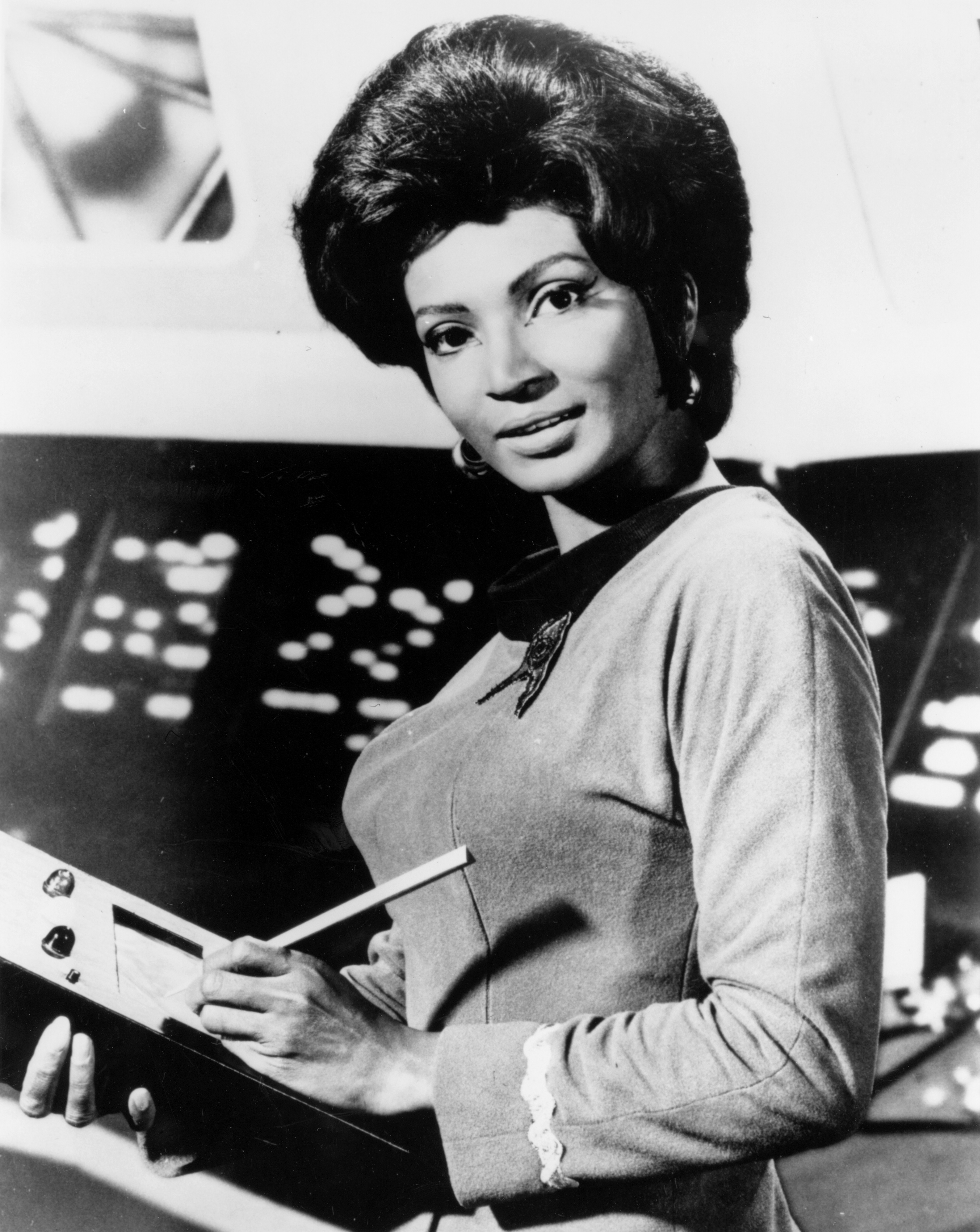
Snodgrass sought to use Uhura as a main character as she hadn't been featured prominently in other stories

Snodgrass was a fan of Star Trek: The Original Series and, after quitting her previous job at a law practice, her friend Victor Milán suggested that she try to become a writer. Milán proposed that she should write a novel about Star Trek. Despite Snodgrass not being on the list of approved authors, her outline was purchased by David G. Hartwell. Snodgrass and Milán discussed ideas and she decided that she would go with a softer, more friendly story along the lines of the episodes "The Trouble with Tribbles" or "The City on the Edge of Forever". Her inspiration for the aliens in the book was because she "couldn't think of anything softer or fuzzier than baby white seals".

Snodgrass wanted Uhura to be central to the book, partially in an attempt to market the book as the character had not been prominently featured in other Star Trek stories. The musical elements added to the character came from Snodgrass' experiences as a musician and singer. A second Uhura-based book, entitled Uhura's Song was released two books later in the numbered series.

The Tears of the Singers was the only Star Trek novel written by Snodgrass, who remembers that Hartwell gave her the advice to use the book to launch her writing career but to never write another one. She subsequently wrote "The Measure of a Man" for the second season of Star Trek: The Next Generation and following the success of that script and episode, she joined the writing team there for the rest of the series.

== Reception ==
Ellen Cheeseman-Meyer, in an article for Tor.com about the appearances of Uhura in Star Trek novels, stated that she "put the book down for a week of rage and derision when I hit page 132". That page featured an in-character consideration by Uhura about whether or not female Starfleet Captains must have lesbian mentalities as the vessels are considered to be female. However, she said that "This book was written in the 80s. I’m sure the question about the socio-sexual impacts of command seemed more cogent then". She thought that the characterization of Uhura in the novel was similar to a Barbie doll, but it did demonstrate the untapped potential of the character.

In Star Trek: Adventures in Time and Space, published in 1999, The Tears of the Singers was described as one of the two defining novels alongside Uhura's Song which "gave Uhura the chance to expand her range beyond hailing frequencies". The author, Mary P. Taylor, described The Tears of the Singers as one of her favorite books.

== Sources ==
- Ayers, Jeff (2006). Star Trek: Voyages of Imagination. New York: Pocket Books. ISBN 978-1416503491.
- Taylor, Mary P. (1999). Star Trek: Adventures in Time and Space. New York: Pocket Books. ISBN 978-0671034153.
