= The Wounded Sky =

Book by Diane Duane

- Cover art, without titles
- Author: Diane Duane
- Cover artist: Boris Vallejo
- Language: English
- Genre: Science fiction
- Publisher: Pocket Books
- Publication date: December 1983
- Publication place: United States
- Media type: Print (Paperback)
- Pages: 255 pp
- ISBN: 0-671-47389-1 (first edition, paperback)
- OCLC: 10260350
- Preceded by: Mutiny on the Enterprise
- Followed by: The Trellisane Confrontation

The Wounded Sky is a 1983 Star Trek novel (Pocket Books #13) by Diane Duane, featuring James T. Kirk as captain of the USS Enterprise. The author would four years later adapt the novel's plot for the teleplay of the first season Star Trek: The Next Generation episode "Where No One Has Gone Before".

== Plot ==
The Enterprise, equipped with a radical new "inversion drive" which allows the ship to bend spacetime and transit immense distances instantly, is sent on a mission to the Magellanic Clouds just outside the Milky Way, in order to place navigation beacons for future extra-galactic voyages using the new technology.

The inversion drive is a product of the "creative physics" practiced by the natives of the Hamal star system, a race of crystalline spider-like beings. The chief designer of the drive is aboard, advising Captain Kirk, as the Enterprise makes its first "jump", after outmaneuvering a Klingon squadron which was sent to capture the new technology. Unknown to anyone on the starship, however, the use of the drive destabilizes spacetime itself on a fundamental level, creating a rift or tear through which another, external universe penetrates and begins to mix with the Enterprise's own, with rapidly spreading, potentially fatal consequences for all life everywhere.

The denouement of the novel follows as Captain Kirk and the Enterprise crew, experiencing bizarre, dream-like experiences of other times and worlds during the use of the drive, realize that something is dreadfully amiss. Arriving near the rift and observing the destruction it inflicts on nearby star systems, they discover that the price for traveling distances that would take centuries to cover with warp drive may be the loss of their own universe. Deliberately using the drive one, final time, they cross the "boundary" between external "reality" and their own collective inner consciousness, where they must together draw on mental, emotional and spiritual strengths to heal the wound that they have caused.

The novel deals intensively with the question of whether reality is an objective thing in and of itself, or a product of conscious perception by humans and other intelligences. Like Duane's other Star Trek novels, it incorporates both real physics and speculative extensions thereof to support the plot.

Like most of Diane Duane's TOS-era novels, this one includes several scenes in the ship's recreation room, one of which quotes a Star Trek filk song based on John Denver's "Calypso".
