= Rules of Engagement (Morwood novel) =

1990 novel by Peter Morwood

- Cover
- Author: Peter Morwood
- Language: English
- Genre: Science fiction
- Publisher: Pocket Books
- Publication date: 1 February 1990
- Publication place: United States
- Media type: Print (Paperback)
- Pages: 245
- ISBN: 0-671-66129-9 (first edition, paperback)
- OCLC: 21002558
- Preceded by: The Kobayashi Maru
- Followed by: The Pandora Principle

Rules of Engagement is a science fiction novel by British write Peter Morwood. Part of the Star Trek: The Original Series franchise, it was published by Pocket Books in 1990.

== Plot ==
Captain James T. Kirk and the crew of the Enterprise are sent to assist in the evacuation of Federation personnel from the planet Dekkanar, which has been engulfed by civil war. Eager to avoid getting entangled in the conflict, Kirk's orders are specifically written so that he may not even raise his ship's shields in defense. The situation becomes even more dire when Kasak, a Klingon commander hoping for a great victory over the Federation to regain his lost honor, engages the Enterprise with an experimental new Klingon cruiser.

The novel also offers an alternate explanation, via Kasak's viewpoint, of why Klingons' facial features have changed over the years.

== Reception ==
The novel entered the New York Times Best Seller list for paperbacks at #13 on February 4, 1990. The book moved up to #10 the following week (with a note that its sales were indistinguishable from the #9 book). The book peaked at #8 in the February 18, 1990, listing before slipping back to #13 on February 25, 1990, and falling off the list after that.
