= Home Is the Hunter =

1990 novel by Dana Kramer-Rolls

- Cover
- Author: Dana Kramer-Rolls
- Cover artist: Keith Birdsong
- Language: English
- Genre: Science fiction
- Publisher: Pocket Books
- Publication date: 1 December 1990
- Publication place: United States
- Media type: Print (Paperback)
- Pages: 288 pp
- ISBN: 0-671-66662-2 (first edition, paperback)
- OCLC: 22770017
- Preceded by: Enemy Unseen
- Followed by: Ghost-Walker

Home Is the Hunter is a Star Trek: The Original Series novel written by Dana Kramer-Rolls.

== Plot ==
Captain Kirk, commanding the USS Enterprise, gets into a fight with a Klingon ship concerning arguments over a primitive planet and its inhabitants. A mysterious, powerful entity named 'Weyland' stops the fight and decides to punish three of the Enterprise crew with their own history.

Hikaru Sulu is sent to feudal Japan during a bloody power struggle. Scotty is sent to eighteenth century Scotland on the eve of revolt. Chekov is sent to his homeland of Russia during World War 2.

All three eventually make it back home to their right time and place, though Sulu left a carved message on a durable rock, as well.
