= Games Wizards Play =

Novel by Diane Duane

- Cover art for Games Wizards Play
- Author: Diane Duane
- Cover artist: Cliff Nielsen
- Language: English
- Series: Young Wizards
- Genre: Fantasy novel
- Publisher: Houghton Mifflin Harcourt
- Publication date: February 2, 2016
- Publication place: United States
- Media type: Print (hardcover)
- Pages: 640
- ISBN: 978-0-54-741806-3
- OCLC: 898052990
- LC Class: PZ7.D84915 Gam 2016
- Preceded by: A Wizard of Mars

Games Wizards Play is the tenth novel in the Young Wizards series by Diane Duane and a sequel to A Wizard of Mars.

== Plot ==
Every eleven years, the Invitational is held, a three-week event where new wizards demonstrate spells. Wizards Kit Rodriguez, Nita Callahan, and Dairine Callahan mentor two individuals: Penn Shao-Feng, who focuses on managing solar weather, and Mehrnaz Farrahi, who specializes in defusing earthquakes while managed by her family.

Together they’re plunged into a whirlwind of cutthroat competition and ruthless judging: it’s “The Apprentice” with magic. Penn’s egotistical and misogynistic attitude toward Nita complicates matters as Nita and Kit work to negotiate their burgeoning boyfriend/girlfriend issues. Meanwhile, Dairine struggles to stabilize her hero-worshipping, insecure protégée against the interference of powerful wizard-relatives using her to further their own tangled agendas. When it finally comes time for the finals stage on the dark side of the Moon, both the new wizards and their mentors are both flung into a final conflict that could either change the Solar System for the better or damage Earth beyond even wizardly repair.
