= Queen Victoria's Bomb =

1967 steampunk novel

- First edition
- Author: Ronald W. Clark
- Language: English
- Genre: Steampunk
- Publisher: Jonathan Cape
- Publication date: 1967
- Publication place: United Kingdom
- Media type: Print (Hardcover)
- Pages: 272 pp
- ISBN: 978-0-7126-9478-0

Queen Victoria's Bomb is a steampunk novel by Ronald W. Clark, published in 1967. Its plot surrounds the invention of a nuclear weapon in the Victorian era which might be used to win the Crimean War.

== See also ==
- Anti-Ice
- To Visit the Queen
