= The Pandora Principle =

1990 novel by Carolyn Clowes

- Cover
- Author: Carolyn Clowes
- Language: English
- Genre: Science fiction
- Publisher: Pocket Books
- Publication date: April 1990
- Publication place: United States
- Media type: Print (Paperback)
- Pages: 273 pp
- ISBN: 0-671-65815-8 (first edition, paperback)
- OCLC: 21263987
- Preceded by: Rules of Engagement
- Followed by: Doctor's Orders

The Pandora Principle is a science fiction novel by American writer Carolyn Clowes, part of the Star Trek: The Original Series. It features the origin story of Saavik, and how she came to know Spock.

== Plot ==
A Romulan Bird of Prey drifts over the Neutral Zone and into Federation territory. Admiral James T. Kirk and the Enterprise take the ship back to Earth, unaware of the deadly force hiding inside. It is soon learned one way to battle the threat is via the traumatic childhood knowledge of Saavik and her birth planet Hellguard.

== Production ==
Saavik's origins are first mentioned in Vonda McIntyre's novelization of Star Trek II: The Wrath of Khan, where she is said to be half-Romulan and from a planet called Hellguard. Clowes expanded on this story to add that she was one of a number of feral children, which was reflected in later works by other authors such as Margaret Wander Bonanno in her novel Unspoken Truth.

Carolyn Clowes was inspired to write a Star Trek novel by Star Trek III: The Search for Spock and the novelization by McIntyre. Clowes first submitted an outline and sample chapters to Pocket Books in 1985, with publication taking place in 1990. She said that: "There was a great deal of back-and-forth with Pocket and Paramount over story, then endless revisions. So it took a while to get born."

== Reception ==
Ellen Cheeseman-Meyer reflected on the book for Tor.com, comparing it to other similar Star Trek novels with Vulcan abduction stories. She considered Saavik to be a Mary Sue character, but one that she liked, and compared the book to works by author Robert A. Heinlein. However, she thought that the downside to the book was that the resolution of the Saavik and Spock story was their encounter during his pon farr during The Search For Spock, a film that Clowes acknowledged in the book.

== Sources ==
- Ayers, Jeff (2006). Star Trek: Voyages of Imagination. New York: Pocket Books. ISBN 9781416503491.
