= A Wizard of Mars =

Novel by Diane Duane

- Cover art for A Wizard of Mars
- Author: Diane Duane
- Cover artist: Cliff Nielsen
- Language: English
- Series: Young Wizards
- Genre: Fantasy novel
- Publisher: Harcourt Trade Publishers
- Publication date: April 14, 2010
- Publication place: United States
- Media type: Print (hardcover)
- Pages: 560
- ISBN: 978-0-15-204770-2
- OCLC: 318875313
- LC Class: PZ7.D84915 Wji 2010
- Preceded by: Wizards at War
- Followed by: Games Wizards Play

A Wizard of Mars is the ninth novel in the Young Wizards series, written by Diane Duane. After being pushed back several times due to internal turmoil at Harcourt Trade Publishers, it was scheduled for release on April 14, 2010, but the distributor shipped it in late March 2010.

== Major characters ==
Juanita Louise Callahan

Juanita "Nita" Louise Callahan is an experienced wizard of around fourteen or fifteen. She is still able to work with living things, but her powers are now developing more towards the oracular bend. She has a lot on her shoulders, having to deal with grief after her mother's and Ponch's death, as well as her sister Dairine, who, after the loss of Roshaun, is behaving oddly as well as being sullen and unresponsive—and Carmela is taunting her about her middle name as well, which she hates, though it gives no reason why. She was initially uninterested in the "Martian thing", but gets caught up in it quickly as Carmela uncovers an ancient prophecy and Kit starts acting strange and then disappears completely. She has several spectacular moments and has to make the most "active" choices and possibly has the most "fighting" role in the book, as Kit makes choices, as important as Nita's, but more passive. She starts to have feelings toward Kit, though she has no "soppy" moments. She develops an elemental affinity with water, which proves important later, along with her friendship with the whale wizard S'ree, and uses the Gibraltar Pass through (a powerful wizardry developed by the hydro mage Angelina Pellegrino) to save her life, along with several other wizardries, though they cost her vast amounts of energy and power. She duels Aurilelde in what is supposed to be to the death, but after defeating her thoroughly, breaks the prophecy which said: "She will slay her rival."

Christopher Rodriguez

Christopher "Kit" Rodriguez is, throughout the book, obsessed with Mars and all things Martian. After messing things up a bit too much and getting himself stuck in an ancient version of Mars—and inside the Martian wizard Khretef—he is faced with a difficult decision, which will affect the course of life in the entire Solar System: will he save Earth or will he save Mars? At home, his sister Helena has arrived, which makes for a hard time dealing with her wild theories about him and his wizardry. Later in the book, he starts to develop feelings toward Nita, though these are continually being overshadowed by those of a certain Martian princess. At the end of the book, these feelings toward Aurilelde are overcome when Nita refers to Kit as her boyfriend, and he tells her that it took her long enough.

Mamvish fsh Wimsih fsh Mentaff

Mamvish is a Species Archivist who relocates species that are in trouble to safer places. She has incredibly high power levels and is an Abstainee, which means that the Lone Power literally "took a vacation" on her Ordeal. (Apparently, the LP left a note for her saying that he had a headache and could not come!) She has a fierce love for tomatoes and is highly sensitive, and has a high vocabulary of insults in the Speech. She looks pretty much like a dinosaur, and when she does wizardry, speech words can be seen under her skin.

Irina Mladen

Irina Mladen, Planetary Wizard for Earth, is described as a young, slim housewife in her thirties, with shaggy, highlighted blonde hair, preferring to travel with a parakeet on her head and a baby in a sling. Though she may look like a regular housekeeper (and is, technically, one of Earth's housekeepers), this is one lady you do not want to cross.

Carmela Emeda Rodriguez

Carmela is a key character in this book, though not a wizard. Ignoring Kit's reluctance to allow her on the trip, she travels with Nita and S'ree and manages to decode an ancient prophecy using her strange gift with languages. She shows no further sign of becoming a wizard, and claims that she is simply training to be a "galactic personal shopper". She also shows interest in Ronan, which he does not reciprocate. She has been amply repaid for the service she did in Wizards at War by being allowed on a nearly endless shopping spree at the Crossings on Rirhath B. She lives for annoying her little brother, and now that Helena is back, it is easier. She also loves to tease Nita by calling her "Juanita LOUISE," since Nita hates her middle name. Carmela's own middle name, now, has an interesting history. Her aunts and uncles fought so much over what her middle name would be that Carmela's mother decided to take their first initials and make a new name out of them.

Helena Rodriguez

We are newly introduced to Helena in this book. She has seemingly gotten over the stage of thinking Kit has had a deal with the devil, but has some odd theories of her own now. Hint: Mutants! She also says near the end of the book, "Wouldn't it be great if there really was this interplanetary brotherhood with all kinds of creatures, you know, banding together and using their powers to fight evil..." Not knowing, of course, how right she was!

Ronan Nolan

Ronan, in this book, along with Darryl, travels with Kit and experiences his own bizarre version of Mars in his imagination. He offers a kind of support for Kit, along with being comic relief. There is no tension at all between him and Nita at this point, though there is also little contact between them in the book.

Darryl

Darryl travels along with Ronan and Kit and has his turn experiencing the Mars of his mind, a strange and silly remake of a movie he watched as a child. He offers comic relief, and there are several references to how much he eats. Him being an abdal makes Nita nervous about him being off-planet, but everything works out.

S'ree

S'ree travels with Nita and Carmela to Mars. She is ultimately the reason Nita can save her own life later in the book: She discusses the possibility that Nita has an elemental affinity with water, and tells her about Angelina Pellegrino, the last great hydro mage, who designed the dangerous and powerful Gibraltar Pass through, used to move and manipulate large quantities of water under precise control. S'ree is familiar with this, and while discussing with Nita ways to stop the threat of still-hazardous underwater mines are safe or not, she also tells her about the uses of the Gibraltar Pass through and about Pellegrino.

Dairine Callahan Not as major or involved as the others, she is shown to be noticeably weakened in her power levels, but still defiantly working to find and save her friend Roshaun. She spends most of her time on Wellakh, learning to control stars, and is confused about Roshaun's status; it does not even say "recall" (basically "deceased"); the entry for his physical status is just a blank space. She looks at this as a possibility of finding him and continues to work towards that, without showing much concern toward her Earth family and spending more time with Roshaun's father, Nelaid, who is teaching her stellar wizardry. The possibility that she is taransh'laev suggesting that she is deep-down Wellakhit, not human.

Bobo/The Peridexis/Peridexic Effect

The peridexic effect, or "Bobo", is becoming more and more major, displaying personality and helping Nita out with bigger spells. He (he does not really have a gender but is called "he") manages to lay out the diagram for the Gibraltar Pass through that Nita has to use and fuel with her own life-energy. He still does not speak to anyone but Nita, and how he is even able to do that is unknown to anyone.

Tom Swale, Carl Romeo

Neither has a very major role, but Kit is "grounded" by them for being irresponsible and careless on Mars.

=== Martians ===
Aurilelde

Aurilelde is a Martian princess, not just a wizard, but a seer, which corresponds with Nita's oracular gift. She is sincerely trying to save her people, but fear has driven her mind to the point of destroying Earth and the Solar System to get what she wants. She "falls in love" with Kit, thinking that he is her old flame, Khretef, which becomes one reason she and Nita duel. She thinks the whole reason Nita is mad at her is because of Kit, but later understands why Nita is angered. She takes Mars's kernel into herself, essentially becoming Mars and almost destroying herself and everyone else in her fury, "not a god of war, but a goddess, and a goddess scorned". She tries to kill Nita by dumping tons and tons of water on her, but Nita successfully uses the Gibraltar Pass through and then duels Aurilelde and defeats her.

Khretef

Khretef, the Martian wizard, is trying desperately to save his people and ensnares Kit into the plot. When Kit tries to explain the flaw to him and explains that Aurilelde has tricked him, he finally gives in, but it is almost too late, until Nita comes to the rescue. Khretef's gift with machinery corresponds with Kit's same ability (supposed to have been from somewhere else), which is briefly touched upon.

Rorsik

Rorsik, a Martian in a position of power behind the leader, Iskard. He has instilled fear into all the others and convinced Iskard to convince Aurilelde to try to kill Nita and wipe out life on Earth to make way for the Martians. It is said by Kit that he has either gotten past his fear or has found himself in a patch of eternity to be scared in.

Iskard

The Martian leader, weakened and subject to Rorsik's persuasion. He is also Aurilelde's father.

=== Not seen physically ===
Ponch

Though not a major character in this, he is mentioned as a "great presence" and speaks through a giant scorpion-like creature, saying, "Earth dogs are not the only dogs, you know." Using Ponch's leash, Kit, Nita, Irina, and Mamvish were able to "save" the Martians.

Peach

Mentioned, though not appearing physically. Peach's long-ago prophecy of "Fear death by water" comes true once again for Nita in this book. Apparently, prophecies can be good more than once, though, Nita laments, there is no sell-by date on any of them, so there is no way to tell if they will.

== Prophecy ==
The Old Mars prophecy is decoded by Carmela after Nita, Carmela, and S'reee, when Carmela makes them (Nita and S'ree) go to Mars to crash Kit's male bonding trip with Ronan and Darryl, during which they discuss the Martians' history, and Carmela studies and works out what most of it meant. The prophecy is said to be named 'The Red Rede' and is in the form of a poem:

The one departed | is the one who returns
From the straitened circle | and the shortened night,
When the blue star rises | and the water burns:
Then the word long-lost | comes again to light
To be spoke by the watcher | who silent yearns
For the lost one found. Yet to wreak aright,
She must slay her rival | and the First World spurn
Lest the one departed | no more return.
