= Wizard's Holiday =

Book by Diane Duane

- Cover art for Wizard's Holiday
- Author: Diane Duane
- Cover artist: Cliff Nielsen
- Language: English
- Series: Young Wizards
- Genre: Fantasy
- Publisher: Harcourt Trade Publishers
- Publication date: 2003
- Publication place: United States
- Media type: Print (mass market paperback)
- Pages: 448
- ISBN: 0-15-205207-0
- OCLC: 60311341
- LC Class: PZ7.D84915 Wm 2003
- Preceded by: A Wizard Alone
- Followed by: Wizards at War

Wizard's Holiday is the seventh book in the Young Wizards series by Diane Duane. It is the sequel to A Wizard Alone.

== Plot summary ==
When Nita's sister Dairine signs up for an intragalactic exchange program without permission, their local advisors transfer the mission to Nita and Kit. The destination seems to be an ideal planet, and they are hoping for a vacation. Meanwhile, the aliens who arrive at Dairine's house appear to be very "alien". However, Nita's dreams become nightmarish and the planet Alaalu turns out to be hiding a dark secret: an avatar of the Lone Power has been trapped in this dystopia since their people refused Its gift of entropy. While this may have prevented deterioration to war, crime and natural disasters, among other things, it also prevented such change as evolution, and the Alaalu people are trapped in their current stage of existence when they have the potential to be free of it. It becomes the young wizards' job to convince the Alaalu wizard and her people to accept this change, inevitably setting the Lone Power free.

On Earth, the wizards at Dairine's place have become aware that their Sun is in danger of flaring up to the point of scorching their planet. However, one of the visitors comes from a planet where he is a guardian against the recurrence of such a disaster, and recognizes it in time for them to save the Earth.

== Characters ==
Nita a.k.a. Juanita Louise Callahan, as Nita goes on the program, she notices how everything is just too peaceful and calm, thinking that something is wrong.

Kit a.k.a. Christopher R. Rodriguez, Nita's partner, joins Nita on this intragalactic exchange program to Alaalu.

Ponch, Kit's dog, joins Kit and Nita on the cultural exchange program to Alaalu, and leads them to the paradise planet's shadowy secret.

Quelt, Alaalu's only wizard (not that Alaalu even needs any other wizards) and is who Nita and Kit stays with.

Dairine E. Callahan, Nita's sister, gets banned from transporting anywhere out of Earth's solar system and must stay at home to help out her dad on the other wizards.

Filif a.k.a. Filifermanhathhumneits'elhhessaifnith, an alien wizard shaped like a Christmas tree, who is one of the exchange students.

Sker'ret, an exchange student who resembles of a giant metal centipede and could eat just about anything. His species are called the Rirhait.

Roshaun a.k.a. Roshaun ke Nelaid am Seriv am Teliuyve am Meseph am Veliz am Teriaunist am det Nuiiliat, (sometimes am det Wellahit) a humanoid alien wizard prince from Wellakhit and a 'kind of' love interest for Dairine and Carmela.
