= The Dragon Lord (Morwood novel) =

1986 novel by Peter Morwood

The Dragon Lord is a novel by Peter Morwood published in 1986.

== Plot summary ==
The Dragon Lord is a novel in which there are alliances change among betrayals involving the Code of Honour.

== Reception ==
Dave Langford reviewed The Dragon Lord for White Dwarf #83, and stated that "Near the end, drama is dispelled by the in-joke of a cameo appearance by Anne ("Aiyyan") McCaffrey, reciting from her own books. This kind of thing should be left to Terry Pratchett."

== Reviews ==
- Review by Pauline Morgan (1987) in Fantasy Review, January-February 1987
- Review by Paul J. McAuley (1987) in Vector 138
