= Young Wizards =

Novel series by Diane Duane

- Cover of So You Want to Be a Wizard, the first book in the series
- So You Want to Be a Wizard; Deep Wizardry; High Wizardry; A Wizard Abroad; The Wizard's Dilemma; A Wizard Alone; Wizard's Holiday; Wizards at War; A Wizard of Mars; Interim Errantry; Games Wizards Play
- Author: Diane Duane
- Country: United States
- Language: English
- Genre: Children's literature, fantasy, science fiction
- Publisher: Delacorte Press; Corgi; Harcourt Children's Books; Houghton Mifflin Harcourt
- Published: 1983-present
- No. of books: 11

Young Wizards is a series of novels by Diane Duane.

The Young Wizards series presently consists of eleven books, focusing on the adventures of two young wizards named Nita and Kit. The series began in 1983 with the book So You Want to Be a Wizard, which told the story of their first experiences with wizardry. In 1997, Duane began a spin-off, the Feline Wizards series, which takes place in the same universe, but with different protagonists.

This series incorporates elements of fantasy, science fiction, and religion. The series deals with issues such as death, sacrifice, and redemption.

== Synopsis ==
The Young Wizards series is set in a world where an entity known as the "Lone Power" is bent on destruction of the entire universe. Fighting back against this is the "Powers That Be", powerful agents working on behalf of the "One" to ensure the universe continues. To help their causes the Powers invite promising individuals to become wizards and join the fight. The entries in the main series follow Nina and Kit, two young teenagers who attend the same school.

== Books ==
=== Main series ===
1. So You Want to be a Wizard. Delacorte. 1983. ISBN 0-15-204738-7.
2. Deep Wizardry. Delacorte. 1985. ISBN 0-15-216257-7.
3. High Wizardry. Corgi. 1990. ISBN 0-15-216244-5.
4. A Wizard Abroad. Corgi. 1993. ISBN 0-15-216238-0.
5. The Wizard's Dilemma. Harcourt. 2001. ISBN 0-15-202551-0.
6. A Wizard Alone. Harcourt. 2002. ISBN 0-15-204562-7.
7. Wizard's Holiday. Harcourt. 2003. ISBN 0-15-204771-9.
8. Wizards at War. Harcourt. 2005. ISBN 0-15-204772-7.
9. A Wizard of Mars. Harcourt. 2010. ISBN 978-0-15-204770-2.
10. Interim Errantry. CreateSpace Independent Publishing Platform. October 2015. ISBN 978-1518688256.
11. Games Wizards Play. Houghton Mifflin Harcourt. 2016. ISBN 978-0547418063.

The official title of book 12 has yet to be released, but in a 2012 interview with GeekDads, Diane Duane used the working title, Wizardry in Shadow.

=== Short stories and novellas ===
- "Uptown Local", first published in the 1986 anthology Dragons and Dreams anthology, later republished in the 20th anniversary edition of So You Want to Be a Wizard and as part of an ebook, Uptown Local and Other Interventions.
- "Theobroma", first published in the 2011 collection Uptown Local and Other Interventions.
- Interim Errantry, a 2015 collection of three stories set between books 9 and 10. Contains "Not on My Patch," "How Lovely Are Thy Branches," and the novel Lifeboats.
- Owl Be Home for Christmas (2020)

=== Interim Errantry: On Ordeal ===
In 2016 Duane published the first of three novels set within the Young Wizards universe. Each focus on a wizard and their first trial against the Lone Power. The three were later combined into a single volume titled Interim Errantry 2: On Ordeal.

- On Ordeal: Roshaun ke Nelaid (2016, Ebooks Direct)
- On Ordeal: Mamvish fsh Wimsih (2016, Errantry Press)
- On Ordeal: Ronan Nolan Jnr (2017)

=== Feline Wizardry ===
Duane has published three books in the Feline Wizardry sequence, which takes place within the Young Wizards universe. The first entry was released in 1997, with a subsequent novel published the following year. A pre-edited version of the third entry was published in 2011, followed by an ebook version in 2017.

1. The Book of Night with Moon (1997) (US ISBN 0-340-69329-0, UK ISBN 0-340-69328-2)
2. To Visit the Queen (1998) (ISBN 0-446-67318-8), published in the UK as On Her Majesty's Wizardly Service (ISBN 0-340-69330-4)
3. The Big Meow (2011) pre-edited version published online; (2017) ebook version

=== Revised editions ===
In August 2012 Diane Duane released a revised versions of the first nine books in the Young Wizards series, which were titled the "New Millennium Editions". These revisions were intended to update the series to reflect modern day technology and culture. These updates were created after Duane received mail from younger readers complaining about the differences in technology and the absence of other elements that were added as real-life technology evolved. She noted that while the first book continued to sell well, these sales dipped until the fifth entry, which has a more modern setting, and continued to increase with further entries. Other revisions to the New Millennium Editions also included improving the writing quality to reflect her current writing style and repair timeline issues, as the long gaps between book releases resulted in "a sort of mini-reboot, and now all those inadvertent reboots have to be reconciled. " Duane stated that the original versions of the novels would still remain available.

== Main characters ==
=== Nita ===
Juanita Louise "Nita" Callahan begins the series in junior high school as a typical "book-nerd" who is often bullied by stronger girls. As the series goes on, she deals with such issues as parents, romance, death, sex, and social bullying. She lives at home with her parents and her genius kid sister Dairine. She is often called "Neets." She loves horse books and listens to Journey (according to High Wizardry). Her wizardly specialty initially seems to be the art of dealing with plants and the living world (sometimes referred to as organic wizardry), but later on shifts more toward wizardly theory and manipulation of kernels—cores of energy found at the center of every person, planet and universe that act as replicable centers for major wizardries. Recent events have suggested that Nita may be switching specialties again, this time into precognition and oracular dreaming, also developing a connection with water.

The third book, High Wizardry, briefly deals with the possibility that Nita and Kit have feelings for each other. In the 9th installment, A Wizard of Mars, Nita admits that she may be jealous of Aurilelde, a female alien that Kit seems to be attracted to. Later, in the heat of the moment, while fighting with the alien princess, she calls Kit her "boyfriend," though she and Kit are not officially "together" until the end of the novel. In the process, she learns that Kit was not attracted to Aurilelde, but her, in a complicated series of events.

Nita has a brief relationship with the Irish wizard Ronan in A Wizard Abroad, although when he reappears in Wizards at War, there isn't any sort of tension.

=== Kit ===
Christopher Kellen "Kit" Rodriguez also starts the series in junior high school, dealing with the issue of becoming a responsible adult. Despite being one year younger than Nita, Kit is usually the more mature member of the pair. Kit is in Nita's grade in school, having skipped a grade. His birthday is August 25. In the first book, he often gets teased because of his Spanish accent and his height, but after their Ordeal, matters improve. Kit also lives at his home in Nita's neighborhood with his parents, his older sister Carmela, and his dog Ponch. The oldest child in his family, Helena, lives at college. Kit is skilled with mechanical objects and sometimes, through Ponch, he is skilled in 'scent'. Kit found his Manual in a used bookstore in NYC.

In A Wizard of Mars, Kit admits to himself that he is attracted to Nita, and that he may have never pursued his feelings because he was afraid of going beyond their friendship. This occurs after he finds himself strangely attracted to the Martian princess Aurilelde, who reminds Kit slightly of Nita when he meets her. His affection for the alien is extinguished when he finds out about Aurilelde's ill intentions but finds out that Aurilelde is actually a counterpart of Nita.

=== Dairine ===
Dairine E. "Dair" Callahan is a brainy child, wise beyond her years. She is known for being obsessed with all things Star Wars and wants to be a Jedi. Although she is three years younger than Nita, she cannot stand it if Nita knows anything that she does not. She figures out that Nita has odd powers, finds out about wizardry, and in High Wizardry becomes a wizard herself, enormously powerful and prematurely skilled, though, as with all wizards, her sheer power diminishes with time. Her Ordeal is a pivotal moment in the history of the universe, as she not only temporarily becomes the Manual, but helps to redeem the Lone Power. Dairine's skill comes through computers, and she is mentally connected to a race of silicon beings and their sentient planet. She calls her computer (which is also her Manual) Spot. There is speculation that she has romantic feelings for Roshaun. According to the New Millennial Edition of High Wizardry, her birthday is October 20, 1997.

=== The Lone Power ===
The Lone Power is the chief antagonist of the series, and appears in various avatars and/or as Itself in each book. It is named as "the Witherer, the Kindler of Wildfires, the one who decreed darkness, the Starsnuffer," (So You Want to Be a Wizard -p238). It is a renegade Power who invented entropy in all its manifestations, including death. Wizards exist in order to fight Its influence, with varying degrees of success. Addressed formally as "Fairest and Fallen", the Lone Power used to be one of the "good" Powers That Be, but Its actions were regarded as "evil" and It fell from grace.

Throughout the series, the Lone Power, as a result of Its actions, deeds, and history, is often equated to Satan, an entity considered evil in Christian and Muslim traditions. For example, in the second book of the series, Nita is asked if she attained her wizardry through a deal with the Devil, to which she responds "Kit and I are the last people that One wants anything to do with."
