= A Wizard Alone =

Novel by Diane Duane

- Cover art for A Wizard Alone
- Author: Diane Duane
- Cover artist: Cliff Nielsen
- Language: English
- Series: Young Wizards
- Genre: Fantasy novel
- Publisher: Harcourt Trade Publishers
- Publication date: 2002
- Publication place: United States
- Media type: Print (Mass market paperback)
- Pages: 352
- ISBN: 0-15-204911-8
- OCLC: 53067386
- LC Class: PZ7.D84915 Wj 2002
- Preceded by: The Wizard's Dilemma
- Followed by: Wizard's Holiday

A Wizard Alone is the sixth book in the Young Wizards series by Diane Duane. It is the sequel to The Wizard's Dilemma.

== Plot summary ==
After the events of The Wizard's Dilemma (her mother's death) Nita is depressed. She has also been having some strange dreams concerning a lone character refusing any help. She has some trouble understanding the lone character's Speech.

Meanwhile, Kit is asked by Tom and Carl to help find Darryl McAllister, an autistic boy who is on his Ordeal - and has been for the past three months but Darryl is not all that he seems. He is an Abdal: a figure of tremendous power and a conduit for goodness from The One who limits the power of the Lone One in the Universe and can exist in more than one place at once. Utilizing Ponch's ability to "walk" through universes, Kit enters Darryl's mind to assist him in the Ordeal where he sees Darryl tortured, but overexposure causes Kit to exhibit antisocial tendencies and mood swings picked up from Darryl himself. He begins to take on Darryl's autistic traits and becomes trapped in Darryl's mind. As Nita looks into strange dreams she begins to understand the lone character who she realizes is the boy Kit is looking into, Darryl. When she realizes that Darryl is an Abdal and that he is actually tricking the Lone One she enters his mind in an attempt to save both Kit and Darryl. Darryl, meanwhile, has created in his mind a trap in which he traps the Lone One and forces him to experience the autism that he deals with daily. This is the trap Kit becomes stuck in and Nita is forced to enter.

In the end Nita breaks the trap and frees Darryl, Kit and the Lone One. Darryl forces the Lone One to accept a deal in which Darryl remains in his own universe if the Lone One will return to it someday. However Darryl escapes this deal through his ability to exist in more than one place and leaves his autistic self behind in the universe while he returns to his body free of autism.
