= So You Want to Be a Wizard =

1983 fantasy novel by Diane Duane

- Cover art for So You Want to Be a Wizard
- Author: Diane Duane
- Cover artist: Cliff Nielsen
- Language: English
- Series: Young Wizards
- Genre: Juvenile fantasy
- Publisher: Harcourt Trade Publishers
- Publication date: 1983 (first printing by Delacorte Press, reprinted 1996 by Harcourt)
- Publication place: United States
- Media type: Print (Mass market paperback)
- Pages: 400
- ISBN: 0-15-216250-X
- OCLC: 45835466
- LC Class: PZ7.D84915 So 1983
- Preceded by: None
- Followed by: Deep Wizardry

So You Want to Be a Wizard by Diane Duane is the first book in her long-running Young Wizards series of novels which currently consists of eleven books by Duane. It was written in 1982 and published the next year. In 2012 a revised "New Millennium Edition" was released as an eBook.

== Premise ==
Nita Callahan, a thirteen-year-old girl living in New York City, discovers a book entitled So You Want to Be a Wizard. She discovers that she can do actual magic and meets Kit Rodriguez, another young Wizard. (The Young Wizards series consistently capitalizes the word Wizard.) She discovers a new hidden magical world.

== Plot ==
Nita, taking refuge in the library from bullies, checks out a book found in the children's section with the provocative title So You Want To Be a Wizard. On the way home, the bullies corner her, beat her up, and take a space pen given to her by her uncle. Before she goes to sleep, she takes the Wizard's Oath. The next morning she looks at her manual and sees her name in its list of Wizards.

While practicing a spell to retrieve the pen, she meets another Wizard Christopher "Kit" Rodriguez, also a new wizard, also making a spell for fearlessness. They create a new spell, which presents a vision of a frightening alternative Manhattan: polluted, lightless, and frightening. A terrible cosmic force (later named as the Lone Power) tries to consume them. They summon a sentient white hole from space, who they call "Fred".

The next day at school, Fred and Nita try to retrieve Nita's pen from the bullies who took it. Fred miscalculates the gravity required to lift the pen from the bullies' possession and swallows it instead and now has a bad case of hiccups. They seek help from local Advisory Wizards. Fred's problem is fixed, but Nita's pen is still gone. They must link Fred to a "worldgate" in Grand Central Station and pull the pen out of him.

Fred also has some alarming news: a crucial book, Naming of Lights (or The Book of Night with Moon) has gone missing. It describes the true nature of the universe. Its shadow book contains descriptions twisted out of their true patterns. If the Lone Power should acquire the first book, the cosmos would be irreparably skewed. The three Wizards go to the dark alternative New York City via the world gate, in order to retrieve the Naming of Lights. Here the Lone Power rules, as well as his supernatural minions live.

Nita retrieves the pen. The Wizards learn that both of the two Books are here. To return home they will have to read from the Bright Book by moonlight. They eavesdrop on the Lone Power's phone call to the archangel Michael. Michael suspects that his brother stole the bright Book, while the Lone Power suspects him of sending Nita and Kit to steal it back. Nita and Kit have not previously considered this, but it does make sense.

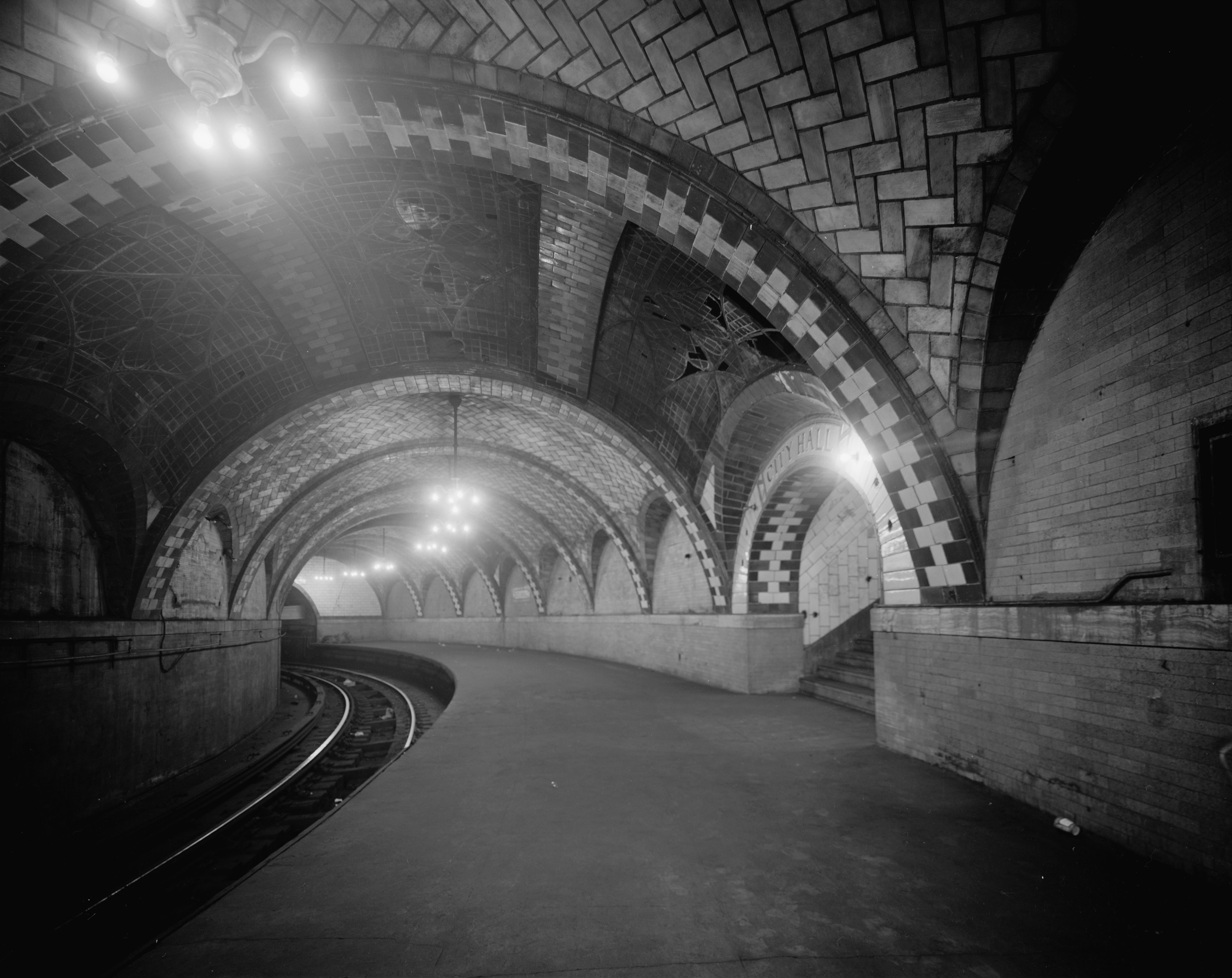
Old City Hall subway platform

Nita steals the dark Book, and uses it to locate the bright Book in the tunnels under City Hall. In the tunnels, they discover the Book is guarded by the Eldest of the fireworms. The Eldest, a dragon, lies on a vast hoard of varied stolen items ranging from the valuable to the trivial. The Wizards bargain with the Eldest. They exchange the dark book for the bright one.

They flee from the Lone Power, who manifests itself physically to chase them. They return to Earth with it still chasing after. It threatens to unmake their universe. In Central Park, they begin to read from the bright Book by moonlight, to undo the changes that the Lone Power has been making during the pursuit. The Lone Power then puts out the Sun, extinguishing the moonlight they need to read the book. Fred sacrifices himself by "blowing his quanta". Reflected by the moon, this becomes moonlight that the Wizards can use to continue reading. As Kit and Nita recite the Lone Power's true name, written in the bright Book, Nita makes a slight modification to the text (the symbol ⎋), giving the Lone Power the option to become a positive rather than negative energy. Renamed and vanquished, the Lone Power withdraws. Nita and Kit go home, their Ordeal complete.

== Characters ==
=== Major characters ===
- Juanita "Nita" Louise Callahan is a lonely thirteen-year-old and does not have many friends before she meets Kit. Nita is gifted in working with the "living world" in wizardry.
- Christopher "Kit" K. Rodriguez is the secondary protagonist. Small for his age and picked on for his Spanish accent, Kit is usually the more mature of the team, despite being younger than Nita. His skill is in working with mechanical objects.
- Fred is a white hole that Nita and Kit accidentally bring down to Earth from space when working their first spell together. His full name is long, but he agrees to let them call him "Fred".
- The Lone Power, also known as "The Lone One" and "Starsnuffer", is the antagonist . It is one of the Powers That Be, but one who went away from the path of good that was intended for the universe, and instead created death.

== Themes ==
One theme is the ability to extend sympathy and understanding to anyone, even enemies. One excellent example of this takes place in the Other Manhattan. In this world, cars are alive, and when a Lotus Esprit kills another car, its prey, a piece of metal gets stuck in it. Upon finding the injured Esprit, Kit cuts out the piece of metal and the car zooms away. Later, when Nita, Kit, and Fred are attempting to find the dark book, the Esprit returns and offers the three of them a ride. It proceeds to assist them in finding the book and in protecting them from the Lone One.

This example shows how by offering sympathy and assistance to the car, who was originally Kit's enemy and would have attacked if it could, Kit received kindness in return.

Another theme is the balance between good and evil. In an interview with Harcourt Books, Duane writes

The issues of the choice between right and wrong has to be an ongoing concern for everybody, at every age. There is no magical point in a human life when anyone is or becomes immune to the second-by-second choice to do right instead of wrong. Everyone has to deal with the choice with every breath, and it's so easy to fail at any moment, no matter how well you've been doing the moment before or may do the moment after. [...] Kids want to know (just as much as adults do, or more) how the hard choices look when they approach, and how to deal with them. "How shall a man do right?" has been one of the most basic human questions since long before Ecclesiastes. It turns up in the Book of the Dead and in old Hittite and Assyrian writings. I don't think I'd qualify as human if it didn't turn up in mine.

== Reception and reviews ==
So You Want to Be a Wizard is listed in What Else Should I Read? Guiding Kids to Good Books, Vol. 2 by Matt Berman as well as Rip-Roaring Reads for Reluctant Teen Readers by Gale W. Sherman and Bette D. Ammon.

== Awards ==
So You Want to Be a Wizard has won the "ALA Quick Pick for Reluctant Young Adult Readers" award.

== Release details ==
- 1983, USA, Harcourt Trade Publishers, ISBN 0-15-216250-X, Mass market paperback
