= Ronald W. Clark =

English writer

William Ronald Clark, known as Ronald William Clark (2 November 1916 – 9 March 1987) was a British author of biography, fiction and non-fiction.

== Early life and education ==
Clark was born in London as William Ronald Clark, the only child of bank cashier, later manager, (William) Ernest Clark and Ethel Kate (née Underdown). He was educated King's College School, at Wimbledon in southwest London; he withdrew from school before the age of eighteen "in full rebellion against his parents" and cut off contact with them, taking a publishing job in central London.

== Career ==
Clark worked in publishing jobs of varied character whilst writing; he encountered no difficulties selling his articles almost from the start, and was encouraged in his writing by his employers. Clark served as a war correspondent during the Second World War after being turned down for military service on medical grounds. As a war correspondent, Clark landed on Juno Beach with the Canadians on D-Day. He followed the war until the end, and remained in Germany to report on the major War Crimes trials as a correspondent for the British United Press.

After returning to Britain he had a desk job with the B.U.P., where he remained until, in 1948, Clark resolved to earn a living through journalism and devote his best energies to the writing of his books. He wrote sixty-six books, covering subjects ranging from mountain climbing (over a dozen titles), the atomic bomb, Balmoral Castle, and world explorers, as well as novels of alternate history. He also wrote a number of biographies of a diverse range of historical figures, including: Charles Darwin, Thomas Edison, Albert Einstein, Benjamin Franklin, Sigmund Freud, J. B. S. Haldane, V. I. Lenin, Bertrand Russell, Ernst Chain, Edward Appleton and William F. Friedman. V. I. Lenin was Clark's last biography and came out the year following his death.

== Personal life ==
Clark was described by his friend John G. Slater of the University of Toronto as "formidable as a person and as a personality... over six feet tall, with a well-developed paunch, bald head, and eyes that fixed upon you... not the sort of man you would hand your hat by mistake". In his later years, on a health regimen, he became quite thin, and by 1986, in ill health, "a very feeble old man" requiring support when walking.

After leaving school for his first job, and having joined an amateur theatrical group, Clark met Irené Tapp (1901-1977), fifteen years his senior. They married in 1938, but shortly after separated. After their divorce, Clark paid maintenance to her for thirty three years. In 1951, he met divorcée Pearla Doris Odden, nine years his senior, and after obtaining agreement for a divorce from his first wife, married Odden in 1953. She "was involved in nearly all aspects of his book production" and was co-author on two of them. They divorced in 1973 (although continuing their collaboration, with Pearla also compensating for Clark's lack of domestic skills) in which year Clark married for the third time, to Elizabeth Allan Soutar, a younger Scottish woman from Elgin, Moray whom he had met as a guest at the home of friends in the country. She too contributed to her husband's writing career with "all the skills of an executive secretary" and acting as a valuable researcher for Clark.

Clark died on 9 March 1987, having suffered a stroke after treatment for "one of the severest cases of shingles his doctor had ever seen". He had in recent years also suffered from gout, which had taken a toll on his health.

== Selected works ==
- The Day the Rope Broke: The Story of the First Ascent of the Matterhorn (1965)
- Queen Victoria's Bomb (science fiction, 1967)
- JBS: The Life and Work of J.B.S. Haldane (1968) ISBN 0-340-04444-6
- The Last Year of the Old World (US: The Bomb That Failed) (Alternate history, 1970) ISBN 0-224-61778-8
- Einstein: The Life and Times (1972) ISBN 0-380-01159-X
- Edison: The Man Who Made The Future (1977) ISBN 0-399-11952-3.
- The Man Who Broke Purple: the Life of Colonel William F. Friedman, Who Deciphered the Japanese Code in World War II (1977)
- The Greatest Power on Earth: The Story of Nuclear Fission (1980) ISBN 0-283-98715-4
- Bertrand Russell and His World (1981) ISBN 0-500-13070-1
- Balmoral, Queen Victoria's Highland Home (1981) ISBN 0-500-25078-2
- The Survival of Charles Darwin (1984) ISBN 0-380-69991-5
- Works of Man: A History of Invention and Engineering from the Pyramids to the Space Shuttle (1985) ISBN 0-670-80483-5, ISBN 9780670804832
- Vladimir Lenin (published posthumously) (1988) ISBN 0060916982
- The Royal Albert Hall (1958)
- Sir Julian Huxley (1960)
- Sir Mortimer Wheeler (1960)
- Sir John Cockcroft (1960)
- Montgomery of Alamein (1960)
- The Birth of the Bomb: The Untold Story of Britain's Part in the Weapon That Changed the World (1961)
- The Rise of the Boffins (1962)
- Sir Winston Churchill (1962) ISBN 978-0460069113
- Great Moments in Espionage (1963)
- Battle for Britain: Sixteen Weeks that Changed the Course of History (1964)
- Tizard (1965)
- The Huxleys (1968) ISBN 0434135801
- Sir Edward Appleton (1971) Pergamon Press
- Biography of the Nuffield Foundation (1972) ISBN 0582364876
- The Role of the Bomber (1977)
- Man Who Broke 'Purple': Life of the World's Greatest Cryptologist, William F. Friedman (1977) ISBN 0552109584
- War Winners (1979) ISBN 0283985038
- Freud: The Man and the Cause (1980)
- Benjamin Franklin (1983) ISBN 0756776139
- Ernst Chain: Penicillin and Beyond (1985)
