= To Visit the Queen =

1998 novel by Diane Duane

- First Printing
- Author: Diane Duane
- Cover artist: Bob Goldstrom
- Language: English
- Series: Wizardry series
- Genre: Fantasy
- Published: 1998 (Aspect)
- Publication place: United States
- Media type: Print
- Pages: 368
- ISBN: 0-446-67318-8
- OCLC: 39533851
- Dewey Decimal: 813/.54 21
- LC Class: PS3554.U233 T6 1999
- Preceded by: The Book of Night with Moon
- Followed by: The Big Meow

To Visit the Queen (1998) (titled On Her Majesty's Wizardly Service in the UK edition) is a fantasy steampunk novel by Diane Duane. Its plot deals with the invention of nuclear weapons in Victorian Britain, thanks to the evil intervention of the Lone Power and the efforts of Duane's wizard feline adventurers to save the day.

It was a sequel to The Book of Night with Moon (1997). In its review, Publishers Weekly said, "Duane presents her usual felicitous mix of magical high adventure and humor, avoiding much of the preciousness that can infect anthropomorphic fantasy. Even those who don't fancy felines should enjoy this purr of a tale." Kirkus Reviews was somewhat less kind, criticising what it termed "a slow start" and "mind numbing details" in a book aimed squarely at the young adult market.

== Cultural reference ==
The title To Visit the Queen is a cultural reference to the English rhyming poem known as "Pussy Cat Pussy Cat"; it is the second line of the poem. The British title On Her Majesty's Wizardly Service is reminiscent of the James Bond title On Her Majesty's Secret Service.

One element of the plot bears a similarity to Project A119.

== See also ==
- Anti-Ice
- Queen Victoria's Bomb
- Chief Mouser to the Cabinet Office
