= Caryn Seamount =

Seamount in the Atlantic Ocean southwest of the New England Seamounts

- Location within Atlantic Ocean

Location
- Location: North Atlantic Ocean
- Coordinates: 36°40.8′N 67°57′W
- Country: none

Geology
- Volcanic arc/chain: New England Seamounts
- Age of rock: ?
- Last eruption: ?

Caryn Seamount is a seamount, or underwater volcano in the Atlantic Ocean. It is an independent seamount located southwest of the New England Seamounts, which was active more than 100 million years ago. It is close to Muir Seamount and the British island territory of Bermuda.
