= Doctor's Orders (novel) =

Star Trek novel by Diane Duane

- Cover
- Author: Diane Duane
- Language: English
- Genre: Science fiction
- Publisher: Pocket Books
- Publication date: June 1990
- Publication place: United States
- Media type: Print (paperback)
- Pages: 291 pp
- ISBN: 0-671-66189-2 (first edition, paperback)
- OCLC: 21696545
- Preceded by: The Pandora Principle
- Followed by: Enemy Unseen

Doctor's Orders is a Star Trek: The Original Series novel written by Diane Duane.

== Plot ==
The Enterprise is assigned to initiate diplomatic relations with the inhabitants of a neutral planet, nicknamed 'Flyspeck', due to the unusual discovery of three intelligent species cohabiting the planet. Following their arrival, and in response to good-natured complaints about his command style, Captain Kirk leaves Doctor McCoy in command of the Enterprise while initiating negotiations. Shortly after, Kirk vanishes, leaving McCoy stuck in command, as regulation forbids him from turning command over to Commander Spock until relieved by Kirk. During the search for the captain, a Klingon battle cruiser arrives, and sends down a landing party who vanishes in the same manner as Kirk. The Klingons hold the Enterprise responsible, and threaten to destroy them but are interrupted by the appearance of an Orion pirate vessel, and an armistice between the Federation and Klingon ships is formed to deal with the threat.

Meanwhile, Kirk is having a discussion with a member of one of the native species who shows Kirk an Orion pirate raid that had befallen the planet in the recent past, and reveals that the planet's inhabitants do not exist only in the present, but also simultaneously in the future and past. Kirk offers aid to them since they cannot interact with the future without withdrawing fully from the past and present. Their conversation ends with Kirk learning that he has been missing for two days, and that the Enterprise is under attack from the Orions. The alien returns Kirk to his ship where he defeats the Orions. Thankful for his assistance, the species of the planet agree to join the Federation.

== Development ==
The story was inspired by Robert A. Heinlein's Starship Troopers, with Heinlein referencing a situation from his novel where a junior officer found himself in command of a naval vessel while on a phone call with Duane. Duane would use this information to create a plausible military regulation that would allow McCoy, a non-line officer, to be placed in command of the Enterprise. The novel also features the return of an original alien species created by Duane for Star Trek: The Kobayashi Alternative.
