= Ghost-Walker =

1991 novel by Barbara Hambly

- Cover
- Author: Barbara Hambly
- Cover artist: Keith Birdsong
- Language: English
- Genre: Science fiction
- Publisher: Pocket Books
- Publication date: 1 February 1991
- Publication place: United States
- Media type: Print (paperback)
- Pages: 273
- ISBN: 0-671-64398-3 (first edition, paperback)
- OCLC: 23011735
- Preceded by: Home Is the Hunter
- Followed by: A Flag Full of Stars

Ghost-Walker is a science fiction novel by American writer Barbara Hambly, part of the Star Trek: The Original Series saga.

== Plot ==
Elcidar Beta III, inhabited by the Midgwins, is a planet strategically located between the Federation and the Klingon empire. The Midgwins' refusal to embrace technological advances have left their planet devastated and their people endangered. The U.S.S. Enterprise tries to help but is hampered by a murderous force that roams its corridors seemingly at will.
