= Peter Morwood =

Irish novelist and screenwriter (1956–2025)

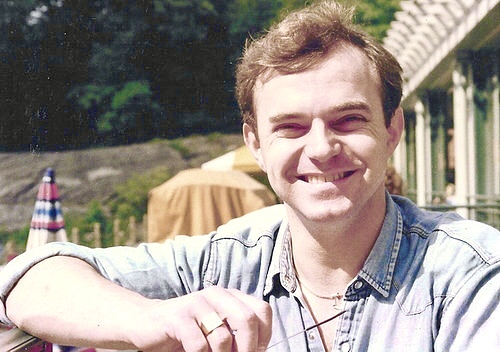
- Morwood in 1987
- Born: Robert Peter Smyth; 20 October 1956; Lisburn, Northern Ireland
- Died: 9 May 2025 (aged 68); Ireland
- Education: Queen's University Belfast
- Occupations: Novelist; screenwriter
- Spouse: Diane Duane (m. 1987)
- Writing career
- Period: 1982–2025
- Notable works: The Horse Lord; The Dragon Lord; Rules of Engagement; The Romulan Way (co-author)
- Website: petermorwood.com

Peter Morwood (born Robert Peter Smyth; 20 October 1956 – 9 May 2025) was an Irish novelist and screenwriter. He is best known for his Horse Lords and Tales of Old Russia series. He lived in Ireland with his wife, writer Diane Duane, with whom he co-authored several works.

== Life and career ==
Morwood was born Robert Peter Smyth in Lisburn, Northern Ireland, on 20 October 1956, son of Dorothy and George; he had a sister.

After graduating from Queen's University Belfast in 1979, He took a position in the UK's civil service, as a clerk working for Customs and Excise. During this period, he began work on his first novel, which he submitted and sold in 1982. He adopted the pen name "Peter Morwood", taking after his mother's maiden name Morwood, and he legally changed his surname to match the pen name in the mid-1980s. His second and third novels were published in 1984 and 1986.

At a science fiction convention in Glasgow in 1985, Morwood was introduced by author Anne McCaffrey to his future wife, the fantasy and science fiction writer Diane Duane. After several more meetings and a brief courtship, Morwood asked Duane to marry him, and they celebrated their engagement at the World Science Fiction Convention in Atlanta, Georgia. Morwood then returned to Northern Ireland to complete his term of employment in the Civil Service, and resigned his post in December 1986. Shortly thereafter he relocated to Los Angeles, California, where Duane was working for the animation studio DiC. They were married at the New England regional science fiction convention, Boskone, on 15 February 1987.

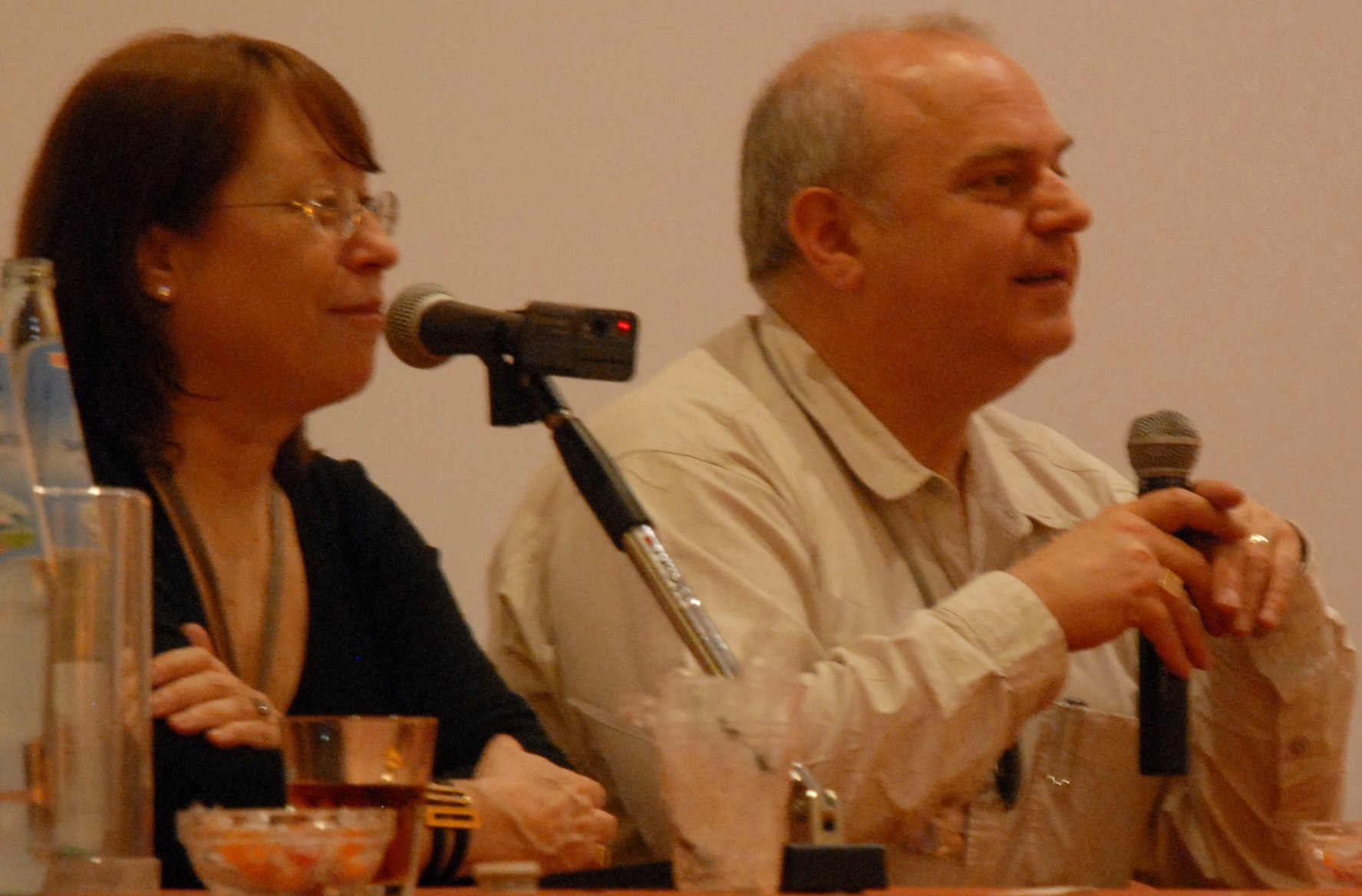
Morwood with his wife Diane in 2010

Later in 1987, Morwood and Duane relocated briefly to Scotland, and then, after a short period spent roving the United Kingdom, moved to the vicinity of Grangecon, County Wicklow, Ireland, where the two of them resided until his death.

Morwood died at home following a brief illness, on 9 May 2025, at the age of 68. His death was announced by his wife, Diane, on the same day. In accordance with his wishes, there was no funeral, but memorial events are to be held later.

== Bibliography ==
=== The Book of Years and Clan Wars sequences ===
These two sequences of books center on a feudal-style realm called Alba and the struggles for supremacy of various clans. The first sequence is told from the point of view of Aldric Talvalin, scion of a warrior clan of Alba, who is unwillingly drawn into the bloody intrigues of Alban politics and the machinations of the Drusalan Empire, including its power-behind-the-throne, the evilly scheming and sorcerous Commander Voord.

- The Horse Lord (ISBN 0-88677-178-1), 1983
- The Demon Lord (ISBN 0-88677-204-4), 1984
- The Dragon Lord (ISBN 0-88677-252-4), 1986
- The Warlord's Domain (ISBN 0-88677-458-6), 1989

A fifth book (tentatively titled The Shadow Lord) and a sixth (title as yet indeterminate) were projected for more than two decades.

The four Horse Lords novels were reissued by DAW Books in 2005 as a pair of two-book omnibus volumes:

- The Book Of Years, Volume 1 (ISBN 0-7564-0306-5)
- The Book Of Years, Volume 2 (ISBN 0-7564-0307-3)

In Volume 2, the novel previously published as The Warlord's Domain was restored to its intended title, The War Lord.

The Clan Wars sequence is (so far) a pair of prequels, telling the story of how the Clan Lords (including Aldric Talvalin's remote ancestors) invaded the land of Alba, settled it, and eventually came to dominate it.

- Greylady (ISBN 0-09-926161-8)
- Widowmaker (ISBN 0-09-931241-7)

A third volume (tentatively titled Cradlesong) was projected.

=== Tales of Old Russia ===
This series, densely interwoven with motifs from Russian folktale and legend, tells the story of the young tsar Ivan Khorlovskiy, heir to the throne of the city of Khorlov. Complications instantly ensue when he meets, on a battlefield full of the slain, the sorceress-tsarevna Marya Morevna, "the most beautiful princess in all the Russias", and becomes involved willy-nilly in her entanglement with the ancient and deadly being known as Koschei the Undying. The series goes on to deal humorously with the difficulties of a "two-kingdom household", especially when one partner is both a skilled sorcerer and the mother of one's (rather unusual) children, and – more seriously – with the political problems that can beset a small independent tsardom in the face of such threats as the Teutonic Knights and the Golden Horde of the Great Khan.

- Prince Ivan (1990)
- Firebird (1992)
- The Golden Horde (1993)

A fourth volume, The Blue Kremlin, was projected since the mid-1990s.

=== Star Trek ===
Morwood solo wrote one Star Trek novel:

- Star Trek: The Original Series #48: Rules of Engagement

He also collaborated on one with Diane Duane (this novel was written during their honeymoon):

- Star Trek: TOS: Rihannsu #2: The Romulan Way

=== Other prose works ===
Morwood occasionally collaborated with Diane Duane on other novels, primarily in "licensed" universes or shared-world scenarios. These include:

The Space Cops sequence:

1. Mindblast
2. Kill Station
3. High Moon

Others:

1. Keeper of the City
2. SeaQuest DSV

=== Screen works ===
==== Animation ====
Morwood wrote various animated scripts, often in collaboration with his wife. These include:

- Batman: The Animated Series (1995)
  - Red Claw Rising
- Gargoyles (1996)
  - The Hound of Ulster
  - Ill Met by Moonlight
- Spider-Man Unlimited (2001)
  - Enter the Hunter!

==== Live action ====
In 1999, Morwood began development work along with Duane on a live-action retelling of the Nibelungenlied. The script they wrote between late 2002 and mid-2003 was produced as a miniseries for the German satellite network Sat.1 by Tandem Communications of Munich, in association with Sony/Columbia Pictures. Directed by Uli Edel, the miniseries, under the title Die Nibelungen, won a DIVA Award for best German movie-for-TV of 2004. A feature version, entitled Sword of Xanten in the UK, screened there late in 2004; a "megafeature" cut of the entire miniseries aired on Channel Four television in the UK in December 2005.

The miniseries had its American premiere airing on the Sci-Fi Channel in late March 2006 under the title Dark Kingdom: The Dragon King. It has also been released on DVD in the US and other markets, under various titles (the previous US title is Curse of the Ring.)
