= Spirit Walker =

Spirit Walker or Spiritwalker may refer to:

== Literature ==
- Spirit Walker (novel), a 2005 fantasy novel by Michelle Paver
- Spiritwalker, a series of nonfiction books by Hank Wesselman
- Spiritwalker, a series of fantasy novels by Kate Elliott

== Other media ==
- Spiritwalker (film), a 2021 South Korean mystery-action fantasy film
- "Spiritwalker" (song), a 1984 song by the Cult
- "Spirit Walker", a 2007 song by Ween from La Cucaracha

== See also ==
- Astral projection
