= High Wizardry =

Novel by Diane Duane

- Cover art for High Wizardry
- Author: Diane Duane
- Cover artist: Cliff Nielsen
- Language: English
- Series: Young Wizards
- Genre: Fantasy novel
- Publisher: Harcourt Trade Publishers
- Publication date: 1990 (first printing by Delacorte Press, reprinted 1997 by Harcourt)
- Publication place: United States
- Media type: Print (Mass market paperback)
- Pages: 368 pp
- ISBN: 0-15-216244-5
- OCLC: 45835464
- LC Class: PZ7.D84915 Hi 1990
- Preceded by: Deep Wizardry
- Followed by: A Wizard Abroad

High Wizardry is the third novel of the Young Wizards series by Diane Duane. It was published in 1990.

== Plot summary ==
When Dairine, Nita's younger sister, finds Nita's copy of the Wizard's manual, she then proceeds to take the Wizard's Oath. Dairine is given her Wizard's manual in the form of a computer, which Dairine nicknames "Spot." Dairine uses her new power to travel to Mars, then to the Crossings, where she is attacked by agents of the Lone Power. When she uses a worldgate to flee, assisted by an unnamed man she meets in a bar, she finds herself on a giant planet consisting entirely of silicon. In the meantime, Nita and Kit discover she is missing and chase after her. Dairine awakens the massive computer embedded in the planet and gets to work designing and naming 'mobiles' after the planet begins to create quicklife (computer-based) creatures. She names them in a variety of ways ranging from computer programs to Star Wars characters.

The Lone Power overshadows a mobile and stirs up animosity against Dairine, convincing a number of them to support him instead. Nita and Kit arrive in time to help her, assisted by the macaw Machu Picchu (Peach), who reveals herself as the One's Champion incarnate. With Peach's assistance, the Lone Power is defeated by stopping the universe from expanding. The resulting light that explodes as a result of this destroys the Lone Power. The Lone Power then returns to "home" with one of the Powers That Be. As he leaves, he tells Kit and Nita to destroy the "shadows" of him that remain. The universe continues to expand and Nita, Kit and Dairine return to their home, where Dairine's computer sprouts legs and follows her upstairs as Nita and Kit talk to their parents.
