= My Enemy, My Ally =

Book by Diane Duane

- 2000 reprint cover, with "Rihannsu" label
- Author: Diane Duane
- Cover artist: Boris Vallejo
- Language: English
- Genre: Science fiction
- Publisher: Pocket Books
- Publication date: July 1984
- Publication place: United States
- Media type: Print (Paperback)
- Pages: 309
- ISBN: 0-671-70421-4 (first edition, paperback)
- Preceded by: Star Trek III: The Search for Spock
- Followed by: The Tears of the Singers

My Enemy, My Ally is a science fiction novel by American writer Diane Duane, part of the Star Trek: The Original Series saga.

== Plot ==
The USS Enterprise is contacted by Ael i-Mhiessan t'Rllaillieu, a Romulan commander with whom Captain Kirk has tangled several times before. Ael has become disillusioned with the Romulan Empire's politics, and is especially concerned with a secret project she has discovered which seeks to use captured Vulcans for medical research with the goal of allowing Romulans to develop extensive mental powers. She convinces her crew to cross the Neutral Zone into Federation space, where the Enterprise is patrolling with the Starships Constellation, Intrepid and the Denebian Defender-class battleship Inaieu. Ael hopes to convince Kirk to launch a strike against the medical facility.

The Captain declines, but when the USS Intrepid mysteriously vanishes during an ion storm, Ael convinces him that the ship has been captured by Romulans and its Vulcan crew will become part of the project. This convinces Kirk to take the Enterprise with Ael's ship, Bloodwing, into Romulan space in a rescue mission. The plan involves Ael's ship pretending to capture the Enterprise, taking it back home through the Romulan defences on a course which will pass close to the research station.

The plan proceeds smoothly until a double cross by Ael's son, Tafv, threatens to leave the Enterprise genuinely captured. This attempt is overturned, the Intrepid and her crew rescued, the base destroyed, and the Enterprise duly heads back to Federation space. Ael and Kirk go their separate ways, he back to duty and she to a life of exile as a traitor. Before leaving she tells Kirk all of her names and their meaning, a highly symbolic act for a Romulan which is only done to "one closer than kin". She tells him her names will be purged from the records back home, rendering her essentially a non-person in Romulan eyes. On returning to Earth Kirk hangs a pennant with Ael's names on it in a remote valley, symbolically counteracting this status.

== Reception ==
In 2015, My Enemy, My Ally was noted as one of the Star Trek novels that was well written, for both outsiders to Star Trek lore and those steeped more deeply in the stories of that science fiction universe.
