= Enemy Unseen (Mitchell novel) =

1990 novel

- Cover
- Author: V.E. Mitchell
- Language: English
- Genre: Science fiction
- Publisher: Pocket Books
- Publication date: October 1990
- Publication place: United States
- Media type: Print (paperback)
- Pages: 279 pp
- ISBN: 0-671-68403-5 (first edition, paperback)
- OCLC: 22464291
- Preceded by: Doctor's Orders
- Followed by: Home Is the Hunter

Enemy Unseen is a Star Trek: The Original Series novel written by V.E. Mitchell.

The novel was originally set before "Where No Man Has Gone Before", but had to be rewritten at a late stage to be set after Star Trek: The Motion Picture, due to Paramount insisting that the Deltans were not part of the United Federation of Planets in that era.

== Plot ==
The Enterprise is assigned to carry a diplomatic mission, which is nothing new. Things start to go really wrong for this one. The Federation ambassador is an old 'flame' of Kirk's, who aggressively tries to rekindle their old romance. Another diplomat presents Kirk with three of his wives, a situation with which he is not comfortable. Things take a turn for the worse when another diplomat is found killed.
