= Airship (disambiguation) =

An airship or dirigible balloon is a type of aerostat or lighter-than-air aircraft that can navigate through the air under its own power.

Airship, The Airship or Airships may also refer to:

- A police helicopter in American English
- Airship (ballad), an 1840 ballad
- Airship (band), a British indie rock band
- Airship (company), an American company that provides marketing and branding services
- The Airship, or 100 Years Hence, a 1908 short film by J. Stuart Blackton
- The Airship, a 1982 film by Rainer Simon
- The Airship (Port Blue album), album by Port Blue 2007
- The Airship, a map in the social deduction game Among Us
- Airships (Bastion Press), a 2002 tabletop game supplement by Bastion Press

== See also ==
- Balloon (aeronautics), any unpowered aircraft that remains aloft using lighter than air gas
