= Doom Striders =

Doom Striders is a 2004 role-playing game supplement published by Bastion Press.

== Contents ==
Doom Striders is a supplement in which powerful, heroic mecha weapons are introduced for face-to-face combat and epic encounters, replacing the impersonal siege engines of old.

== Reviews ==
- Pyramid
- Backstab #49

== See also ==
- Guildcraft
- Airships (Bastion Press)
