= Star Trek (2009 film) =

Film by J. J. Abrams

- Theatrical release poster
- Directed by: J. J. Abrams
- Written by: Roberto Orci; Alex Kurtzman
- Based on: Star Trek by Gene Roddenberry
- Produced by: J. J. Abrams; Damon Lindelof
- Starring: John Cho; Ben Cross; Bruce Greenwood; Simon Pegg; Chris Pine; Zachary Quinto; Winona Ryder; Zoe Saldaña; Karl Urban; Anton Yelchin; Eric Bana; Leonard Nimoy
- Cinematography: Dan Mindel
- Edited by: Mary Jo Markey; Maryann Brandon
- Music by: Michael Giacchino
- Production companies: Paramount Pictures; Spyglass Entertainment; Bad Robot Productions
- Distributed by: Paramount Pictures
- Release dates: April 7, 2009 (Sydney Opera House); May 8, 2009 (United States)
- Running time: 127 minutes
- Country: United States
- Language: English
- Budget: $150 million
- Box office: $385 million

Star Trek is a 2009 American science fiction action film directed by J. J. Abrams and written by Roberto Orci and Alex Kurtzman. It is the 11th film in the Star Trek franchise, and is a reboot that features the main characters of the original Star Trek television series portrayed by a new cast. The film follows James T. Kirk (Chris Pine) and Spock (Zachary Quinto) aboard the USS Enterprise as they combat Nero (Eric Bana), a Romulan from their future who threatens the United Federation of Planets. The story takes place in an alternate reality that features both an alternate birth location for James T. Kirk and further alterations in history stemming from the time travel of both Nero and the original series Spock (Leonard Nimoy). The alternate reality was created in an attempt to free the film and the franchise from established continuity constraints while simultaneously preserving original story elements.

The idea for a prequel film which would follow the Star Trek characters during their time in Starfleet Academy was first discussed by the series creator, Gene Roddenberry, in 1968. The concept resurfaced in the late 1980s, when it was postulated by Harve Bennett as a possible plotline for what would become Star Trek VI: The Undiscovered Country, but it was rejected in favor of other projects by Roddenberry. Following the critical and commercial failure of Star Trek: Nemesis and the cancellation of Star Trek: Enterprise, the franchise's executive producer, Rick Berman, and the screenwriter Erik Jendresen wrote an unproduced film titled Star Trek: The Beginning, which would take place after Enterprise. After the separation of Viacom and CBS Corporation in 2005, former Paramount Pictures president Gail Berman convinced CBS to allow Paramount to produce a new film in the franchise. Orci and Kurtzman were soon approached to write the film, and Abrams was approached to direct it. Kurtzman and Orci used inspiration from novels and graduate school dissertations, as well as the series itself. Principal photography occurred between November 2007 and March 2008, in locations around California and Utah. Abrams wanted to avoid using greenscreen, and preferred sets and locations instead. Heavy secrecy surrounded the production of the film, which was under the fake working title Corporate Headquarters. Industrial Light & Magic (ILM) used digital ships for the film, as opposed to miniatures used in most of the previous films in the franchise. Production for the film concluded by the end of 2008.

Star Trek was heavily promoted in the months preceding its release; pre-release screenings for the film premiered in select cities around the world, including Austin, Sydney, and Calgary. It was released in the United States on May 8, 2009, to critical acclaim. The film was a financial success, grossing over $385 million worldwide against its $150 million production budget. It was nominated for several awards, including four at the 82nd Academy Awards, winning Best Makeup—the only Academy Award a Star Trek film has won. It was followed by the sequels Star Trek Into Darkness (2013) and Star Trek Beyond (2016).

== Plot ==
In 2233, the Federation starship USS Kelvin investigates a "lightning storm" in space. A Romulan ship, Narada, emerges from the storm and attacks the Kelvin, then demands that Kelvin's Captain Robau come aboard to negotiate a truce. Robau is questioned about the current stardate and an "Ambassador Spock", whom he does not recognize. Narada's commander, Nero, kills him, and resumes attacking the Kelvin. George Kirk, Kelvin's first officer, orders the ship's personnel, including his pregnant wife Winona, to abandon ship while he pilots the Kelvin on a collision course with Narada, since the Kelvin's autopilot is disabled. While Kirk sacrifices his life, Winona gives birth to James Tiberius Kirk.

Twenty-two years later on the planet Vulcan, a young Spock is admitted to the Vulcan Science Academy. Realizing that the Academy views his human mother, Amanda, as a "disadvantage", he joins Starfleet instead. On Earth, following a bar fight with Starfleet cadets accompanying Nyota Uhura, an adult Kirk meets Captain Christopher Pike, who encourages him to enlist in Starfleet Academy. There, Kirk meets and befriends Doctor Leonard McCoy. Three years later, Commander Spock accuses Kirk of cheating during the Kobayashi Maru simulation. Kirk argues that cheating was acceptable because the simulation was designed to be unbeatable. The disciplinary hearing is interrupted by a distress signal from Vulcan. With the primary fleet out of range, the cadets are mobilized. McCoy and Kirk board Pike's ship, the Enterprise.

Recognizing that the "lightning storm" observed near Vulcan is similar to the one that occurred when he was born, Kirk convinces Pike that the signal is a trap. Arriving, the Enterprise finds the fleet destroyed and Narada drilling into Vulcan's core. Narada attacks Enterprise and Pike surrenders, delegating command of the ship to Spock and promoting Kirk to first officer. Kirk, Hikaru Sulu, and Chief Engineer Olson perform a space jump onto the drilling platform. While Olson is killed mid-jump, Kirk and Sulu disable the drill, but are unable to stop Nero from launching "red matter" into Vulcan's core, forming an artificial black hole that destroys Vulcan. The Enterprise rescues Spock's father, Sarek, and the high council before Vulcan's destruction, but Amanda falls to her death before the transporter can lock onto her. As Narada approaches Earth, Nero tortures Pike to gain access to Earth's defense codes.

Spock maroons Kirk on Delta Vega after he attempts mutiny. There, Kirk encounters an older Spock from an alternate timeline, who explains that he and Nero are from 2387. In the future, Romulus was threatened by a supernova, which Spock attempted to stop with red matter. His plan failed, resulting in Nero's family perishing along with Romulus, while the Narada and Spock's vessel were caught in the black hole and sent back in time. They were sent back 25 years apart, during which time Nero attacked the Kelvin, changing history and creating a parallel universe. After Spock's arrival, Nero stranded him on Delta Vega to watch Vulcan's destruction. Reaching a Starfleet outpost, Kirk and the elder Spock meet Montgomery "Scotty" Scott, who devises a trans-warp transporter system, allowing him and Kirk to beam onto Enterprise.

Following the elder Spock's advice, Kirk provokes younger Spock into attacking him, forcing Spock to recognize himself as emotionally compromised and relinquish command to Kirk. After talking with Sarek, Spock decides to help Kirk. While Enterprise hides within the gas clouds of Titan, Kirk and Spock beam aboard Narada. Kirk fights Nero and rescues Pike, while Spock uses the elder Spock's ship to destroy the drill. Spock leads Narada away from Earth and sets his ship to collide with Narada. Enterprise beams Kirk, Pike, and Spock aboard. The older Spock's ship and Narada collide, igniting the red matter. Narada is consumed in a black hole that Enterprise escapes.

Kirk is promoted to captain and given command of Enterprise, while Pike is promoted to rear admiral. Spock encounters his older self, who persuades him to continue serving in Starfleet, encouraging him to do what feels right rather than what is logical. Spock becomes first officer under Kirk's command.

== Cast ==
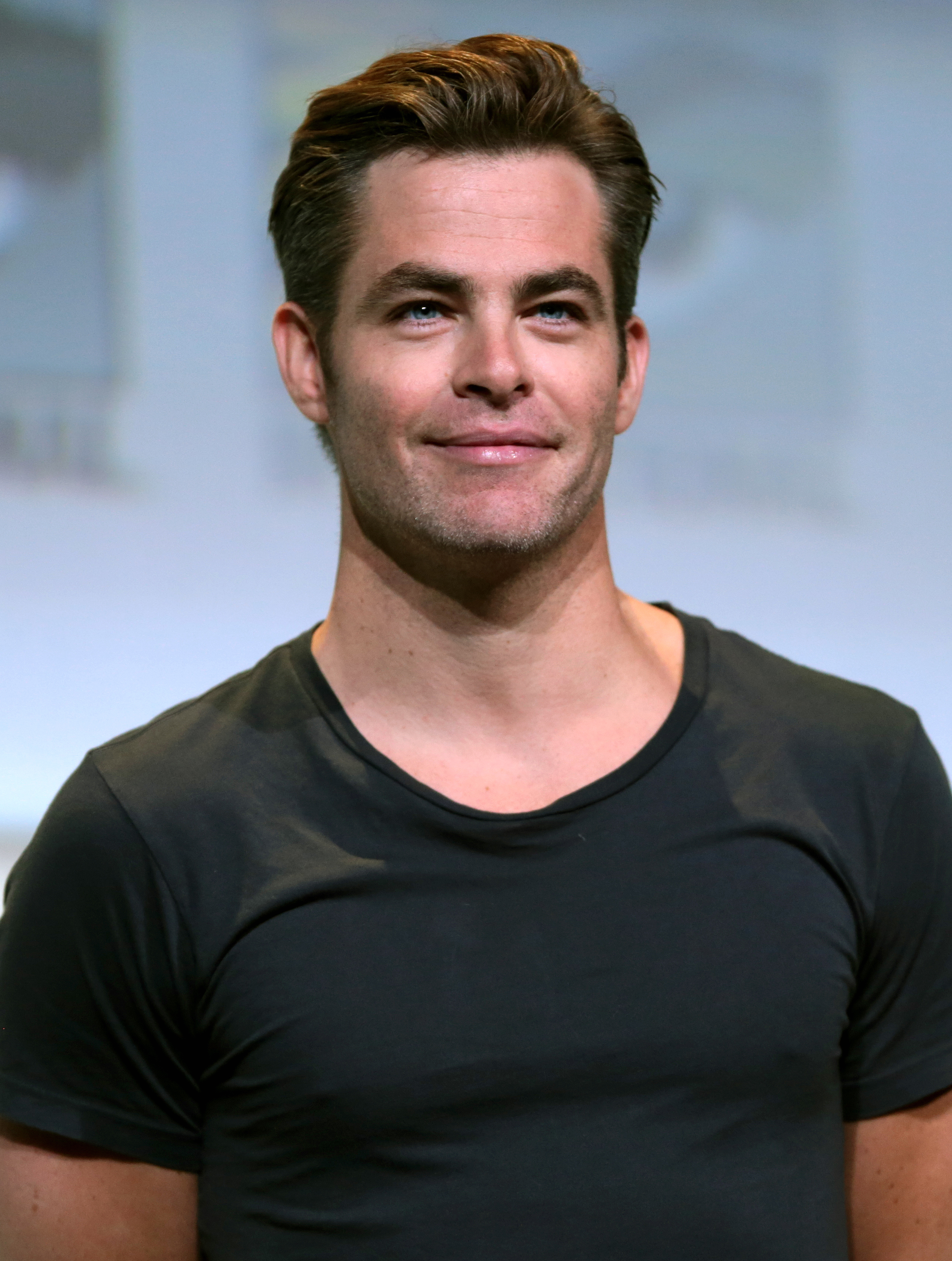
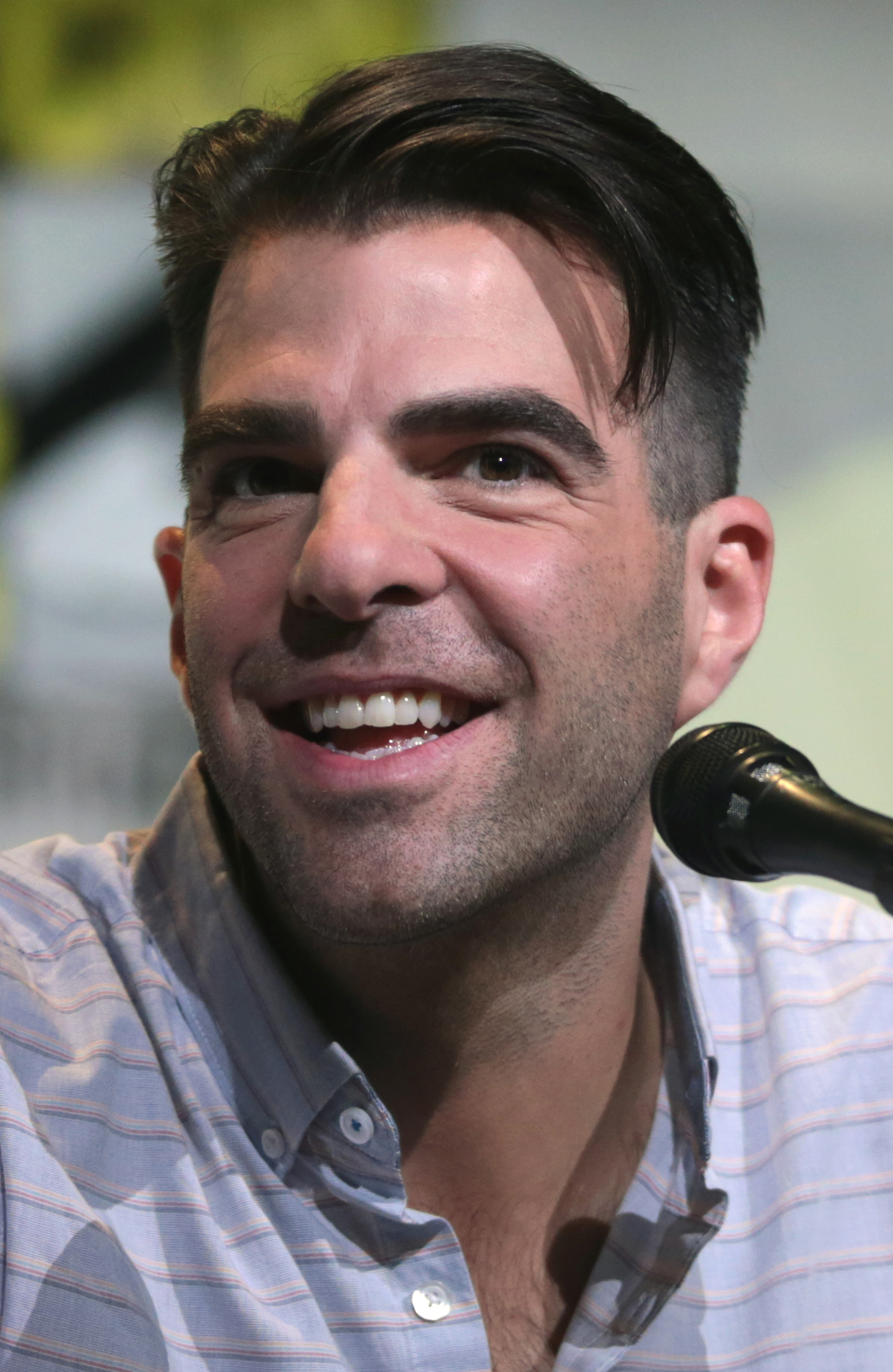
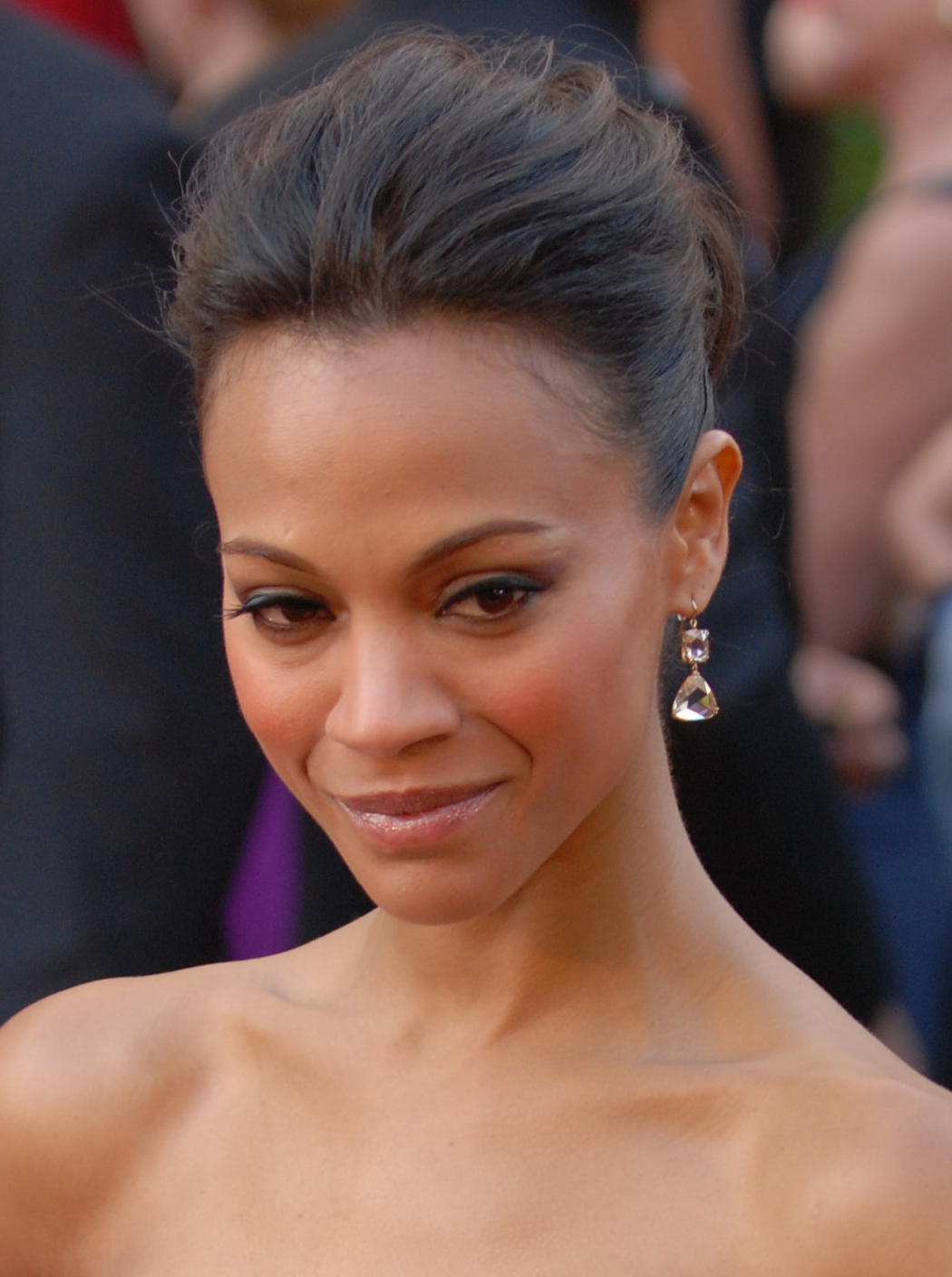
From top to bottom: Chris Pine, Zachary Quinto and Zoe Saldaña.
- Chris Pine as James T. Kirk: Pine described his first audition as awful, because he could not take himself seriously as a leader. Chris Pratt, Timothy Olyphant and Sebastian Stan were either screen-tested or auditioned for the role. Abrams did not see Pine's first audition, and it was only after Pine's agent met Abrams' wife that the director decided to give him another audition opposite Quinto. Quinto was supportive of Pine's casting because they knew each other as they worked out at the same gym. After getting the part, Pine sent William Shatner a letter and received a reply containing Shatner's approval. Pine watched classic episodes and read encyclopedias about the Star Trek universe, but stopped as he felt weighed down by the feeling he had to copy Shatner. Pine felt he had to show Kirk's "humor, arrogance and decisiveness," but not Shatner's speech pattern, which would have bordered on imitation. Pine said when watching the original series, he was also struck by how Shatner's performance was characterized by humor. Instead, Pine chose to incorporate elements of Tom Cruise from Top Gun and Harrison Ford's portrayals of Indiana Jones and Han Solo.
  - Jimmy Bennett as Young Kirk.
- Zachary Quinto as Spock: Quinto expressed interest in the role because of the duality of Spock's half-human, half Vulcan heritage, and how "he is constantly exploring that notion of how to evolve in a responsible way and how to evolve in a respectful way. I think those are all things that we as a society, and certainly the world, could implement." He mentioned he heard about the new film and revealed his interest in the role in a December 2006 interview with the Pittsburgh Post-Gazette: the article was widely circulated and he attracted Abrams' interest. For the audition, Quinto wore a blue shirt and flattened his hair down to feel more like Spock. He bound his fingers to practice the Vulcan salute, shaved his eyebrows and grew and dyed his hair for the role. He conveyed many of Spock's attributes, such as his stillness and the way Nimoy would hold his hands behind his back. Quinto commented the physical transformation aided in portraying an alien, joking "I just felt like a nerd. I felt like I was 12 again. You look back at those pictures and you see the bowl cut. There's no question I was born to play the Spock role. I was sporting that look for a good four or five years." Adrien Brody had discussed playing the role with the director before Quinto was cast.
  - Jacob Kogan as Young Spock.
  - Leonard Nimoy as Spock Prime: Nimoy reprises the role of the older Spock from the original Star Trek timeline. He was a longtime friend of Abrams' parents, but became better acquainted with Abrams during filming. Although Quinto watched some episodes of the show during breaks in filming, Nimoy was his main resource in playing Spock. Abrams and the writers met Nimoy at his house; writer Roberto Orci recalled that the actor gave a "'Who are you guys and what are you up to?' vibe" before being told how important he was to them. He was silent, and Nimoy's wife Susan Bay told the creative team he had remained in his chair after their conversation, emotionally overwhelmed by his decision after turning down many opportunities to revisit the role. Had Nimoy disliked the script, production would have been delayed for it to be rewritten. Nimoy later said, "This is the first and only time I ever had a filmmaker say, 'We cannot make this film without you and we won't make it without you'". He was "genuinely excited" by the script's scope and its detailing of the characters' backstories, saying, "We have dealt with [Spock's being half-human, half-Vulcan], but never with quite the overview that this script has of the entire history of the character, the growth of the character, the beginnings of the character and the arrival of the character into the Enterprise crew." Abrams commented, "It was surreal to direct him as Spock, because what the hell am I doing there? This guy has been doing it for forty years. It's like 'I think Spock would...'". Leonard Nimoy voices the "Space, the final frontier..." lines at the end of the film, lines which were voiced by William Shatner in the original TV series and original cast films.
- Karl Urban as Dr. Leonard "Bones" McCoy. Like Pine, Urban said of taking on the role that "it is a case of not doing some sort of facsimile or carbon copy, but really taking the very essence of what DeForest Kelley has done and honoring that and bringing something new to the table". Urban has been a fan of the show since he was seven years old and actively pursued the role after rediscovering the series on DVD with his son. Urban was cast at his first audition, which was two months after his initial meeting with Abrams. He said he was happy to play a comedy-heavy role, something he had not done since The Price of Milk, because he was tired of action-oriented roles. When asked why McCoy is so cantankerous, Urban joked the character might be a "little bipolar actually!" Orci and Kurtzman had collaborated with Urban on Xena: Warrior Princess, in which he played Cupid and Caesar.
- Zoe Saldaña as Nyota Uhura: Abrams had liked her work and requested that she play the role. Saldaña never saw the original series, though she had played a Trekkie in The Terminal (2004), but agreed to play the role after Abrams had complimented her. "For an actor, that's all you need, that's all you want. To get the acknowledgment and respect from your peers," she said. She met with Nichelle Nichols, who explained to her how she had created Uhura's background, and also named the character. Saldaña's mother was a Star Trek fan and sent her voice mails during filming, giving advice on the part. Sydney Tamiia Poitier also auditioned for the part. The film officially establishes the character's first name, which had never been previously uttered on TV or in film.
- Simon Pegg as Montgomery "Scotty" Scott: Abrams contacted Pegg by e-mail, offering him the part. To perform Scotty's accent, Pegg was assisted by his wife Maureen, who is from Glasgow, although Pegg said Scotty was from Linlithgow and wanted to bring a more East Coast sound to his accent, so his resulting performance is a mix of both accents that leans towards the West sound. He was also aided by Tommy Gormley, the film's Glaswegian first assistant director. Pegg described Scotty as a positive Scottish stereotype, noting "Scots are the first people to laugh at the fact that they drink and fight a bit", and that Scotty comes from a long line of Scots with technical expertise, such as John Logie Baird and Alexander Graham Bell. Years before, Pegg's character in Spaced joked that every odd-numbered Star Trek film being "shit" was a fact of life. Pegg noted "Fate put me in the movie to show me I was talking out of my ass."
- John Cho as Hikaru Sulu: Abrams was concerned about casting a Korean-American as a Japanese character, but George Takei explained to the director that Sulu was meant to represent all of Asia on the Enterprise, so Abrams went ahead with Cho. Cho acknowledged being an Asian-American, "there are certain acting roles that you are never going to get, and one of them is playing a cowboy. [Playing Sulu] is a realization of that dream — going into space." He cited the masculinity of the character as being important to him, and spent two weeks fight training. Cho suffered an injury to his wrist during filming, although a representative assured it was "no big deal". James Kyson Lee was interested in the part, but because Quinto was cast as Spock, the producers of the TV show Heroes did not want to lose another cast member for three months.
- Anton Yelchin as Pavel Chekov: As with the rest of the cast, Yelchin was allowed to choose what elements to adopt from his predecessor's performances. Yelchin decided to carry on Walter Koenig's speech patterns of replacing "v"s with "w"s, although he and Abrams felt this was a trait more common of Polish accents than Russian ones. He described Chekov as an odd character, being a Russian who was brought on to the show "in the middle of the Cold War". He recalled a "scene where they're talking to Apollo [who says], 'I am Apollo.' And Chekov is like, 'And I am the czar of all Russias.' [...] They gave him these lines. I mean he really is the weirdest, weirdest character."
- Eric Bana as Captain Nero: The film's time-traveling Romulan villain. Bana shot his scenes toward the end of filming. He was "a huge Trekkie when [he] was a kid", but had not seen the films. Even if he were "crazy about the original series", he would not have accepted the role unless he liked the script, which he deemed "awesome" once he read it. Bana knew Abrams because they coincidentally shared the same agent. Bana improvised the character's speech patterns.
- Bruce Greenwood as Christopher Pike: The captain of the Enterprise.
- Ben Cross as Sarek: Spock's father.
- Winona Ryder as Amanda Grayson: Spock's mother.
- Clifton Collins Jr. as Ayel: Nero's first officer.
- Chris Hemsworth as George Kirk: Kirk's father, who died aboard the USS Kelvin while battling the Romulans. Before Hemsworth was cast, Abrams met with Matt Damon about playing the role.
- Jennifer Morrison as Winona Kirk: Kirk's mother.
- Rachel Nichols as Gaila: An Orion Starfleet cadet.
- Faran Tahir as Richard Robau: Captain of the USS Kelvin.
- Deep Roy as Keenser: Scotty's alien assistant on Delta Vega.
- Greg Ellis as Chief Engineer Olson: The redshirt who is killed during the space jump.
- Tyler Perry as Admiral Richard Barnett: The head of Starfleet Academy.
- Amanda Foreman as Hannity, a Starfleet officer on the Enterprise bridge.
- Spencer Daniels as Johnny, a childhood friend of Kirk. Daniels was set to play his older brother, George Samuel "Sam" Kirk, Jr., but the majority of his scenes were cut and James Kirk's callout was overdubbed.
- Victor Garber as Klingon Interrogator, the officer who tortures Nero during his time on Rura Penthe. His scene was cut from the film and was featured on the DVD.

Chris Doohan, the son of the original Scotty, James Doohan, makes a cameo appearance in the transporter room. Pegg e-mailed Doohan about the role of Scotty, and the actor promised him his performance "would be a complete tribute to his father". Chris Doohan previously cameoed in Star Trek: The Motion Picture. Greg Grunberg has a vocal cameo as Kirk's alcoholic stepfather. Grunberg was up for the role of Olson but dropped out due to a scheduling conflict. Grunberg was also interested in playing Harry Mudd, who was in an early draft of the script. Brad William Henke filmed scenes in the role which were cut out. Diora Baird appears in a deleted scene as an Orion cadet that Kirk mistakes for Gaila. Star Trek: Enterprise star Dominic Keating also auditioned for the role. Paul McGillion auditioned for Scotty, and he impressed producers enough that he was given another role as a 'Barracks Leader'. Abrams offered Ricky Gervais a role in the film, but he turned it down due to being unfamiliar with the series. James Cawley, producer and star of the webseries Star Trek: New Voyages, appears as a Starfleet officer, while Pavel Lychnikoff and Lucia Rijker play Romulans, Lychnikoff a Commander and Rijker a CO. W. Morgan Sheppard, who played a Klingon in Star Trek VI: The Undiscovered Country, appears in this film as the head of the Vulcan Science Council. Wil Wheaton, known for portraying Wesley Crusher on Star Trek: The Next Generation, was brought in, through urging by Greg Grunberg, to voice several of the other Romulans in the film. Star Trek fan and Carnegie Mellon University professor Randy Pausch (who died on July 25, 2008) cameoed as a Kelvin crew member, and has a line of dialogue. Majel Barrett, the widow of Star Trek creator Gene Roddenberry, reprised her role as the voice of the Enterprise's computer, which she completed two weeks before her death on December 18, 2008. The film was dedicated to her, as well as Gene, to whom the film was always going to be commemorated as a sign of respect.

Orci and Kurtzman wrote a scene for William Shatner, where old Spock gives his younger self a recorded message by Kirk from the previous timeline. "It was basically a Happy Birthday wish knowing that Spock was going to go off to Romulus, and Kirk would probably be dead by the time," and it would have transitioned into Shatner reciting "where no man has gone before". But Shatner wanted to share Nimoy's major role, and did not want a cameo, despite his character's death in Star Trek Generations. He suggested the film canonize his novels where Kirk is resurrected, but Abrams decided if his character was accompanying Nimoy's, it would have become a film about the resurrection of Kirk, and not about introducing the new versions of the characters. Nimoy disliked the character's death in Generations, but also felt resurrecting Kirk would be detrimental to this film.

Nichelle Nichols suggested playing Uhura's grandmother, but Abrams could not write this in due to the Writers Guild strike. Abrams was also interested in casting Keri Russell, but they deemed the role he had in mind for her too similar to her other roles.

== Production ==
=== Development ===
As early as the 1968 World Science Fiction Convention, Star Trek creator Gene Roddenberry had said he was going to make a film prequel to the television series. However, the prequel concept did not resurface until the late 1980s, when Ralph Winter and Harve Bennett submitted a proposal for a prequel during development of the fourth film. Roddenberry rejected Bennett's prequel proposal in 1991, after the completion of Star Trek V: The Final Frontier. Then David Loughery wrote a script entitled The Academy Years, but it was shelved in light of objections from Roddenberry and the fanbase. The film that was commissioned instead ended up being Star Trek VI: The Undiscovered Country. In February 2005, after the financial failure of the tenth film, Star Trek: Nemesis (2002), and the cancellation of the television series Star Trek: Enterprise, the franchise's executive producer Rick Berman and screenwriter Erik Jendresen began developing a new film entitled Star Trek: The Beginning. It was to revolve around a new set of characters, led by Kirk's ancestor Tiberius Chase, and be set during the Earth-Romulan War—after the events of Enterprise but before the events of the original series.

In 2005, Viacom, which owned Paramount Pictures, separated from CBS Corporation, which retained Paramount's television properties, including ownership of the Star Trek brand. Gail Berman then president of Paramount, convinced CBS' chief executive, Leslie Moonves, to allow them eighteen months to develop a new Star Trek film, otherwise Paramount would lose the film rights. Berman approached Mission: Impossible III writers Roberto Orci and Alex Kurtzman for ideas on the new film, and after the film had completed shooting she asked their director, Abrams, to produce it. Abrams, Orci, and Kurtzman, plus producers Damon Lindelof and Bryan Burk, felt the franchise had explored enough of what took place after the series, Orci and Lindelof consider themselves trekkies, and feel some of the Star Trek novels have canonical value, although Roddenberry never considered the novels to be canon. Kurtzman is a casual fan, while Burk was not. Abrams' company Bad Robot produced the film with Paramount, marking the first time another company had financed a Star Trek film. Bill Todman, Jr.'s Level 1 Entertainment also co-produced the film, but, during 2008, Spyglass Entertainment replaced them as financial partner.

In an interview, Abrams said that he had never seen Star Trek: Nemesis because he felt the franchise had "disconnected" from the original series. For him, he said, Star Trek was about Kirk and Spock, and the other series were like "separate space adventure[s] with the name Star Trek". He also acknowledged that as a child he had actually preferred the Star Wars movies. He noted that his general knowledge of Star Trek made him well suited to introduce the franchise to newcomers, and that, being an optimistic person, he would make Star Trek an optimistic film, which would be a refreshing contrast to the likes of The Dark Knight. He added that he loved the focus on exploration in Star Trek and the idea of the Prime Directive, which forbids Starfleet from interfering in the development of primitive worlds; but that, because of the budgetary limitations of the original series, it had "never had the resources to actually show the adventure". He noted that he initially became involved with the project as producer only because he wanted to help Orci, Kurtzman, and Lindelof.

On February 23, 2007, Abrams accepted Paramount's offer to direct the film, after having initially been attached to it solely as a producer. He explained that he had decided to direct the film because, after reading the script, he realized that he "would be so agonizingly envious of whoever stepped in and directed the movie". Orci and Kurtzman said that their aim had been to impress a casual fan like Abrams with their story. Abrams noted that, during filming, he had been nervous "with all these tattooed faces and pointy ears, bizarre weaponry and Romulan linguists, with dialogue about 'Neutral Zones' and 'Starfleet' [but] I knew this would work, because the script Alex and Bob wrote was so emotional and so relatable. I didn't love Kirk and Spock when I began this journey – but I love them now."

=== Writing ===
"We're from different worlds, Alex [Kurtzman] was born here, and I was born in Mexico City and lived there until I was nine. Kirk and Spock are opposites from two worlds. That's us in a nutshell. We're drawn to each by what each of us lacks. The story of this film is about two guys who are such opposites that they might end up strangling each other but instead they bond and thrive together. That's us. We can go warp speed together."

— Roberto Orci on the film's emotional context.

Orci said getting Leonard Nimoy in the film was important. "Having him sitting around a campfire sharing his memories was never gonna cut it" though, and time travel was going to be included in the film from the beginning. Kurtzman added, saying the time travel creates jeopardy, unlike other prequels where viewers "know how they all died". The writers acknowledged time travel had been overused in the other series, but it served a good purpose in creating a new set of adventures for the original characters before they could completely do away with it in other films. Abrams selected the Romulans as the villains because they had been featured less than the Klingons in the series and thought it would be "fun" to have them meet Kirk before they do in the series. Orci and Kurtzman noted it would feel backward to demonize the Klingons again after they had become heroes in later Star Trek series, and the Romulan presence continues Spock's story from his last chronological appearance in "Unification", an episode of Star Trek: The Next Generation set in 2368. The episode of the original continuity in which Kirk becomes one of the first humans to ever see a Romulan, "Balance of Terror", served as one of the influences for the film. Orci said it was difficult giving a good explanation for the time travel without being gimmicky, like having Nero specifically seeking to assassinate Kirk.

Orci noted that while the time travel story allowed them to alter some backstory elements such as Kirk's first encounter with the Romulans, they could not use it as a crutch to change everything and tried to approach the film as a prequel as much as possible. Kirk's service on Farragut, a major backstory point to the original episode "Obsession", was left out because it was deemed irrelevant to the story of Kirk meeting Spock, although Orci felt nothing in his script precluded it from the new film's backstory. There was a scene involving Kirk meeting Carol Marcus (who is revealed as the mother of his son in Star Trek II: The Wrath of Khan) as a child, but it was dropped because the film needed more time to introduce the core characters. Figuring out ways to get the crew together required some contrivances, which Orci and Kurtzman wanted to explain from old Spock as a way of the timeline mending itself, highlighting the theme of destiny. The line was difficult to write and was ultimately cut out.

The filmmakers sought inspiration from novels such as Prime Directive, Spock's World and Best Destiny to fill in gaps unexplained by canon; Best Destiny particularly explores Kirk's childhood and names his parents. One idea that was justified through information from the novels was having Enterprise built on Earth, which was inspired by a piece of fan art of Enterprise being built in a shipyard. Orci had sent the fan art to Abrams to show how realistic the film could be. Orci explained parts of the ship would have to be constructed on Earth because of the artificial gravity employed on the ship and its requirement for sustaining warp speed, and therefore the calibration of the ship's machinery would be best done in the exact gravity well which is to be simulated. They felt free to have the ship built in Iowa because canon is ambiguous as to whether it was built in San Francisco, but this is a result of the time travel rather than something intended to overlap with the original timeline. Abrams noted the continuity of the original series itself was inconsistent at times.

Orci and Kurtzman said they wanted the general audience to like the film as much as the fans, by stripping away "Treknobabble," making it action-packed and giving it the simple title of Star Trek to indicate to newcomers they would not need to watch any of the other films. Abrams saw humor and sex appeal as two integral and popular elements of the show that needed to be maintained. Orci stated being realistic and being serious were not the same thing. Abrams, Burk, Lindelof, Orci and Kurtzman were fans of The Wrath of Khan, and also cited The Next Generation episode "Yesterday's Enterprise" as an influence. Abrams' wife Katie was regularly consulted on the script, as were Orci, Kurtzman and Lindelof's wives, to make the female characters as strong as possible. Katie Abrams' approval of the strong female characters was partly why Abrams signed on to direct.

Orci and Kurtzman read graduate school dissertations on the series for inspiration; they noted comparisons of Kirk, Spock and McCoy to Shakespearian archetypes, and Kirk and Spock's friendship echoing that of John Lennon and Paul McCartney. They also noted that, in the creation of this film, they were influenced by Star Wars, particularly in pacing. "I want to feel the space, I want to feel speed and I want to feel all the things that can become a little bit lost when Star Trek becomes very stately" said Orci. Star Wars permeated in the way they wrote the action sequences, while Burk noted Kirk and Spock's initially cold relationship mirrors how "Han Solo wasn't friends with anyone when they started on their journey." Spock and Uhura were put in an actual relationship as a nod to early episodes highlighting her interest in him. Orci wanted to introduce strong Starfleet captains, concurring with an interviewer that most captains in other films were "patsies" included to make Kirk look greater by comparison.

USS Kelvin, the ship Kirk's father serves on, is named after J.J. Abrams' grandfather, as well as the physicist and engineer Lord Kelvin (William Thomson). Kelvin's captain, Richard Robau (Faran Tahir), is named after Orci's Cuban uncle: Orci theorized the fictional character was born in Cuba and grew up in the Middle East. Another reference to Abrams' previous works is Slusho, which Uhura orders at the bar where she meets Kirk. Abrams created the fictitious drink for Alias and it reappeared in viral marketing for Cloverfield. Its owner, Tagruato, is also from Cloverfield and appears on a building in San Francisco. The red matter in the film is in the shape of a red ball, an Abrams motif dating back to the pilot of Alias.

=== Design ===
The film's production designer was Scott Chambliss, a longtime collaborator with Abrams. Chambliss worked with a large group of concept illustrators, including James Clyne, Ryan Church, creature designer Neville Page, and Star Trek veteran John Eaves. Abrams stated the difficulty of depicting the future was that much of modern technology was inspired by the original show, and made it seem outdated. Thus, the production design had to be consistent with the television series but also feel more advanced than the real-world technology developed after it. "We all have the iPhone that does more than the communicator," said Abrams. "I feel like there's a certain thing that you can't really hold onto, which is kind of the kitschy quality. That must go if it's going to be something that you believe is real." Prop master Russell Bobbitt collaborated with Nokia on recreating the original communicator, creating a $50,000 prototype. Another prop recreated for the film was the tricorder. Bobbitt brought the original prop to the set, but the actors found it too large to carry when filming action scenes, so technical advisor Doug Brody redesigned it to be smaller. The phaser props were designed as spring-triggered barrels that revolve and glow as the setting switches from "stun" to "kill". An Aptera Typ-1 prototype car was used on location.

Panorama of Enterprise's redesigned bridge

Production designer Scott Chambliss maintained the layout of the original bridge, but aesthetically altered it with brighter colors to reflect the optimism of Star Trek. The viewscreen was made into a window that could have images projected on it to make the space environment palpable. Abrams compared the redesign to the sleek modernist work of Pierre Cardin and the sets from 2001: A Space Odyssey, which were from the 1960s. He joked the redesigned bridge made the Apple Store look "uncool". At the director's behest, more railings were added to the bridge to make it look safer, and the set was built on gimbals so its rocking motions when the ship accelerates and is attacked were more realistic. To emphasize the size of the ship, Abrams chose to give the engine room a highly industrial appearance: he explained to Pegg that he was inspired by RMS Titanic, a sleek ship in which there was an "incredible gut".

Abrams selected Michael Kaplan to design the costumes because he had not seen any of the films, meaning he would approach the costumes with a new angle. For the Starfleet uniforms, Kaplan followed the show's original color-coding, with dark gray (almost black) undershirts and pants and colored overshirts showing each crew member's position. Command officers wear gold shirts, science and medical officers wear blue, and operations (technicians, engineers, and security personnel) wear red. Kaplan wanted the shirts to be more sophisticated than the originals and selected to have the Starfleet symbol patterned on them. Kirk wears only the undershirt because he is a cadet. Kaplan modelled the uniforms on Kelvin on science fiction films of the 1940s and 1950s, to contrast with Enterprise-era uniforms based on the ones created in the 1960s. For Abrams, "The costumes were a microcosm of the entire project, which was how to take something that's kind of silly and make it feel real. But how do you make legitimate those near-primary color costumes?"

Lindelof compared the film's Romulan faction to pirates with their bald, tattooed heads and disorganized costuming. Their ship, Narada, is purely practical with visible mechanics as it is a "working ship", unlike the Enterprise crew who give a respectable presentation on behalf of the Federation. Chambliss was heavily influenced by the architecture of Antoni Gaudí for Narada, who created buildings that appeared to be inside out: by making the ship's exposed wires appear like bones or ligaments, it would create a foreboding atmosphere. The ship's interior was made of six pieces that could be rearranged to create a different room. The Romulan actors had three prosthetics applied to their ears and foreheads, while Bana had a fourth prosthetic for the bite mark on his ear that extends to the back of his character's head. The film's Romulans lack the V-shaped ridges on the foreheads, which had been present in all of their depictions outside the original series. Neville Page wanted to honor that by having Nero's crew ritually scar themselves too, forming keloids reminiscent of the 'V'-ridges. It was abandoned as they did not pursue the idea enough. Kaplan wanted aged, worn, and rugged clothes for the Romulans because of their mining backgrounds and found some greasy looking fabrics at a flea market. Kaplan tracked down the makers of those clothes, who were discovered to be based in Bali, and commissioned them to create his designs.

Barney Burman supervised the makeup for the other aliens: his team had to rush the creation of many of the aliens, because originally the majority of them were to feature in one scene towards the end of filming. Abrams deemed the scene too similar to the cantina sequence in Star Wars and decided to dot the designs around the film. A tribble was placed in the background of Scotty's introduction. Both digital and physical makeup was used for aliens.

=== Filming ===
Principal photography for the film began on November 7, 2007, and wrapped on March 27, 2008; however second unit filming occurred in Bakersfield, California, in April 2008, which stood in for Kirk's childhood home in Iowa. Filming was also done at the City Hall of Long Beach, California; the San Rafael Swell in Utah; and the California State University, Northridge in Los Angeles (which was used for establishing shots of students at Starfleet Academy). A parking lot outside Dodger Stadium was used for the ice planet of Delta Vega and the Romulan drilling rig on Vulcan. The filmmakers expressed an interest in Iceland for scenes on Delta Vega, but decided against it: Chambliss enjoyed the challenge of filming scenes with snow in southern California. Other Vulcan exteriors were shot at Vasquez Rocks, a location that was used in various episodes of the original series. A Budweiser plant in Van Nuys was used for Enterprise's engine room, while a Long Beach power plant was used for Kelvin's engine room.

Filming locations in Star Trek

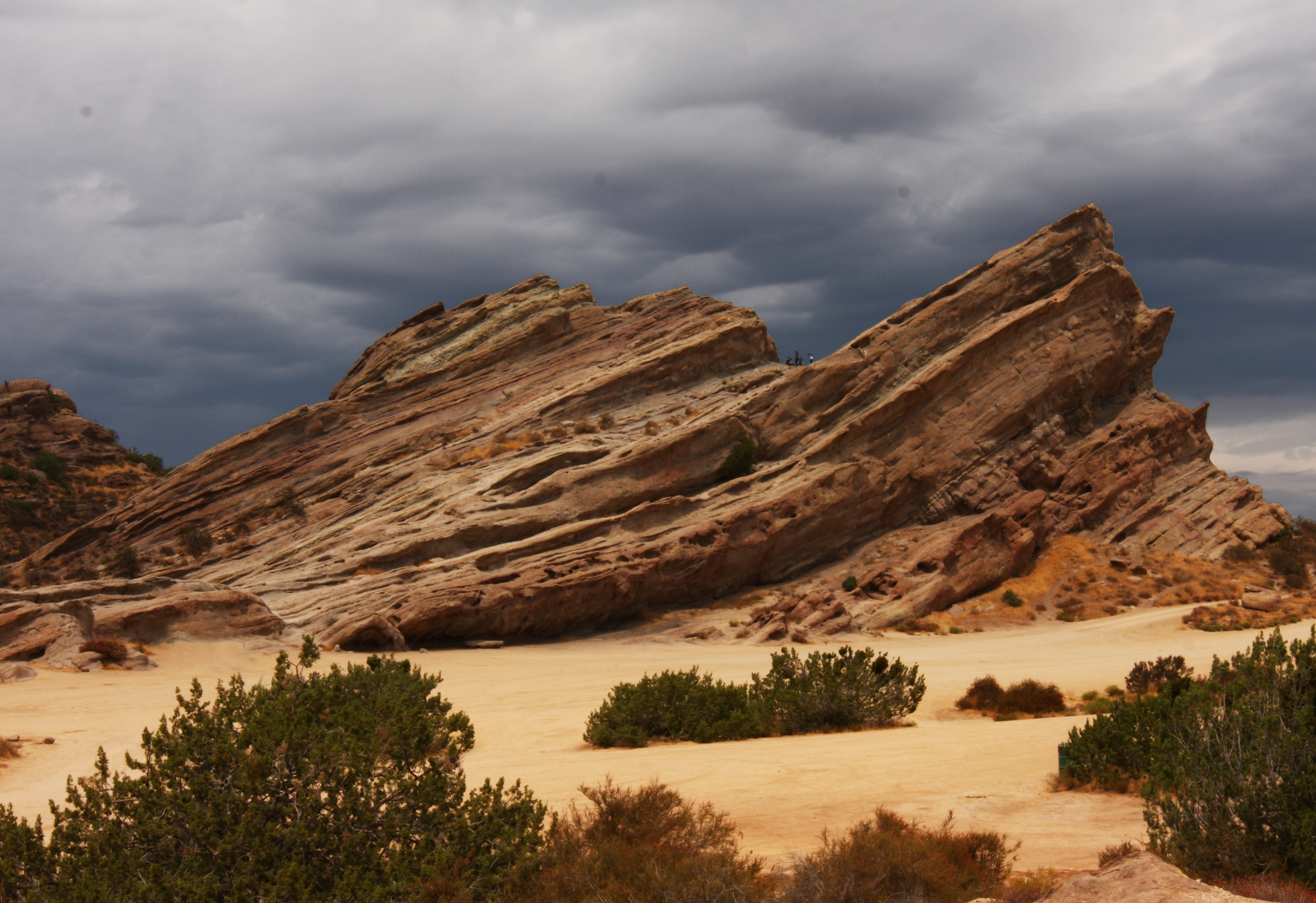
Vasquez Rocks

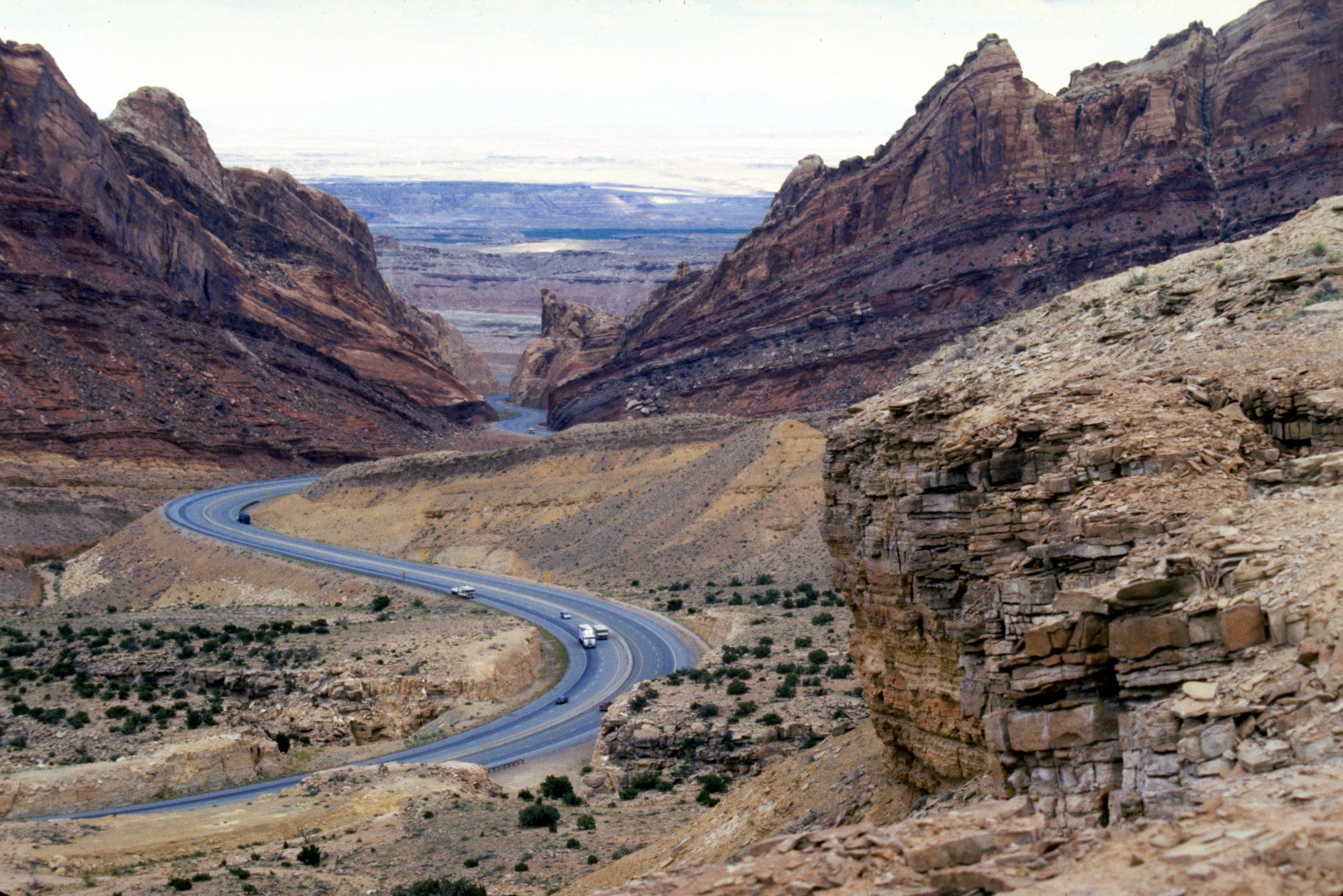
San Rafael Swell

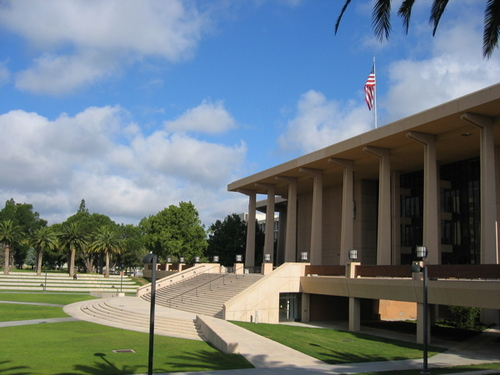
California State University, Northridge

Following the initiation of the 2007–2008 Writers Guild of America strike on November 5, 2007, Abrams, himself a WGA member, told Variety that while he would not render writing services for the film and intended to walk the picket line, he did not expect the strike to impact his directing of the production. In the final few weeks before the strike and start of production, Abrams and Lindelof polished the script for a final time. Abrams was frustrated that he was unable to alter lines during the strike, whereas normally they would have been able to improvise new ideas during rehearsal, although Lindelof acknowledged they could dub some lines in post-production. Orci and Kurtzman were able to stay on set without strikebreaking because they were also executive producers on the film; they could "make funny eyes and faces at the actors whenever they had a problem with the line and sort of nod when they had something better". Abrams was able to alter a scene where Spock combats six Romulans from a fistfight to a gunfight, having decided there were too many physical brawls in the film.

The production team maintained heavily enforced security around the film. Karl Urban revealed, "[There is a] level of security and secrecy that we have all been forced to adopt. I mean, it's really kind of paranoid crazy, but sort of justified. We're not allowed to walk around in public in our costumes, and we have to be herded around everywhere in these golf carts that are completely concealed and covered in black canvas. The security of it is immense. You feel your freedom is a big challenge." Actors like Jennifer Morrison were only given the scripts of their scenes. The film's shooting script was fiercely protected even with the main cast. Simon Pegg said, "I read [the script] with a security guard near me – it's that secretive." The film used the fake working title of Corporate Headquarters. Some of the few outside of the production allowed to visit the set included Rod Roddenberry, Ronald D. Moore, Jonathan Frakes, Walter Koenig, Nichelle Nichols, Ben Stiller, Tom Cruise and Steven Spielberg (who had partially convinced Abrams to direct because he liked the script, and he even advised the action scenes during his visit).

When the shoot ended, Abrams gave the cast small boxes containing little telescopes, which allowed them to read the name of each constellation it was pointed at. "I think he just wanted each of us to look at the stars a little differently," said John Cho. After the shoot, Abrams cut out some scenes of Kirk and Spock as children, including seeing the latter as a baby, as well as a subplot involving Nero being imprisoned by and escaping from the Klingons. This explanation for his absence during Kirk's life confused many to whom Abrams screened the film. Other scenes cut out explained that the teenage Kirk stole his stepfather's antique car because he had forced him to clean it before an auction; and that the Orion he seduced at the Academy worked in the operations division. Afterward, she agrees to open the e-mail containing his patch that allows him to pass the Kobayashi Maru test.

Abrams chose to shoot the film in the anamorphic format on 35mm film after discussions about whether the film should be shot in high-definition digital video. Cinematographer Dan Mindel and Abrams agreed the choice gave the film a big-screen feel and the realistic, organic look they wanted for the film setting. Abrams and Mindel used lens flares throughout filming to create an optimistic atmosphere and a feeling that activity was taking place off-camera, making the Star Trek universe feel more real. "There's something about those flares, especially in a movie that potentially could be incredibly sterile and CGI and overly controlled. There's just something incredibly unpredictable and gorgeous about them." Mindel would create more flares by shining a flashlight or pointing a mirror at the camera lens, or using two cameras simultaneously and therefore two lighting setups. Editor Mary Jo Markey later said in an interview that he had not told her (or fellow editor Maryann Brandon) this, and initially contacted the film developers asking why the film seemed overexposed.

=== Visual effects ===
Industrial Light & Magic and Digital Domain were among several companies that created over 1,000 visual effects shots. The visual effects supervisors were Roger Guyett, who collaborated with Abrams on Mission: Impossible III and also served as second unit director, and Russell Earl. Abrams avoided shooting only against bluescreen and greenscreen, because it "makes me insane", using them instead to extend the scale of sets and locations. The Delta Vega sequence required the mixing of digital snow with real snow.

Star Trek was the first film in which ILM worked using entirely digital ships. Enterprise was intended by Abrams to be a merging of its design in the series and the refitted version from the original film. Abrams had fond memories of the revelation of Enterprise's refit in Star Trek: The Motion Picture, because it was the first time the ship felt tangible and real to him. The iridescent pattern on the ship from The Motion Picture was maintained to give the ship depth, while model maker Roger Goodson also applied the "Aztec" pattern from The Next Generation. Goodson recalled Abrams also wanted to bring a "hot rod" aesthetic to the ship. Effects supervisor Roger Guyett wanted the ship to have more moving parts, which stemmed from his childhood dissatisfaction with the ship's design: The new Enterprise's dish can expand and move, while the fins on its engines split slightly when they begin warping. Enterprise was originally redesigned by Ryan Church using features of the original, at 1,200 feet (370 m) long, but was doubled in size to 2,357 feet (718 m) long to make it seem "grander", while the Romulan Narada is five miles long and several miles wide. The filmmakers had to simulate lens flares on the ships in keeping with the film's cinematography.

Carolyn Porco of NASA was consulted on the planetary science and imagery. The animators realistically recreated what an explosion would look like in space: short blasts, which suck inward and leave debris from a ship floating. For shots of an imploding planet, the same explosion program was used to simulate it breaking up, while the animators could manually composite multiple layers of rocks and wind sucking into the planet. Unlike other Star Trek films and series, the transporter beam effects swirl rather than speckle. Abrams conceived the redesign to emphasize the notion of transporters as beams that can pick up and move people, rather than a signal composed of scrambled atoms.

Lola Visual Effects worked on 50 shots, including some animation to Bana and Nimoy. Bana required extensive damage to his teeth, which was significant enough to completely replace his mouth in some shots. Nimoy's mouth was reanimated in his first scene with Kirk following a rerecording session. The filmmakers had filmed Nimoy when he rerecorded his lines so they could rotoscope his mouth into the film, even recreating the lighting conditions, but they realized they had to digitally recreate his lips because of the bouncing light created by the campfire.

=== Sound effects ===
The sound effects were designed by Star Wars sound designer Ben Burtt. Whereas the phaser blast noises from the television series were derived from The War of the Worlds (1953), Burtt made his phaser sounds more like his blasters from Star Wars, because Abrams' depiction of phasers were closer to the blasters' bullet-like fire, rather than the steady beams of energy in previous Star Trek films. Burtt reproduced the classic photon torpedo and warp drive sounds: he tapped a long spring against a contact microphone, and combined that with cannon fire. Burtt used a 1960s oscillator to create a musical and emotional hum to the warping and transporting sounds.

== Music ==
Michael Giacchino, Abrams' most frequent collaborator, composed the music for Star Trek. He kept the original theme by Alexander Courage for the end credits, which Abrams said symbolized the momentum of the crew coming together. Giacchino admitted personal pressure in scoring the film, as "I grew up listening to all of that great [Trek] music, and that's part of what inspired me to do what I'm doing [...] You just go in scared. You just hope you do your best. It's one of those things where the film will tell me what to do." Scoring took place at the Sony Scoring Stage with a 107-piece orchestra and 40-person choir. An erhu, performed by Karen Han, was used for the Vulcan themes. A distorted recording was used for the Romulans. Varèse Sarabande, the record label responsible for releasing albums of Giacchino's previous scores for Alias, Lost, Mission: Impossible III, and Speed Racer, released the soundtrack for the film on May 5. The music for the theatrical trailers were composed by Two Steps from Hell.

== Release ==
=== Marketing ===
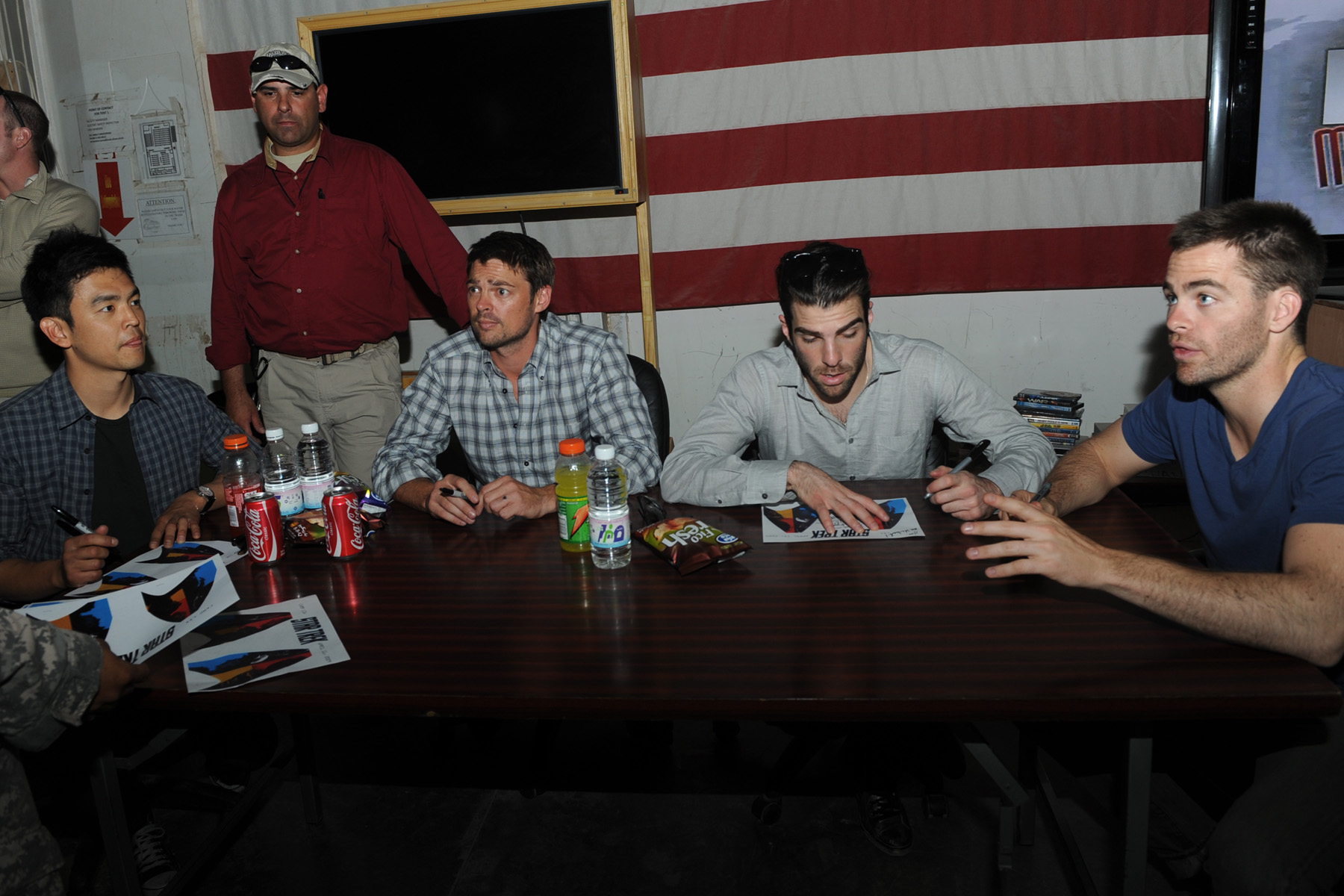
John Cho, Karl Urban, Zachary Quinto, and Chris Pine signing autographs for military personnel at Camp Arifjan in Kuwait in April 2009

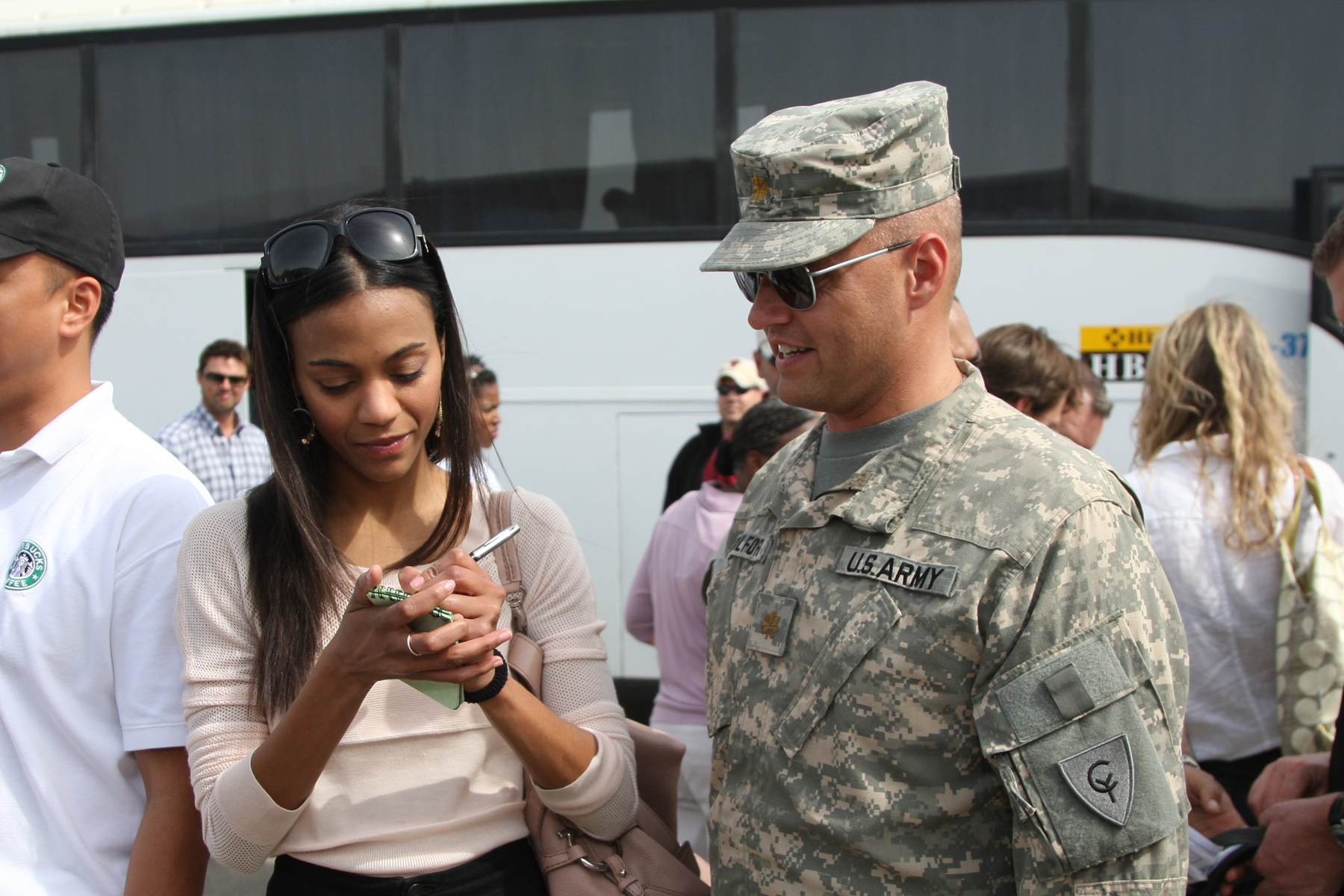
Zoe Saldaña signing an autograph at Camp Arifjan in Kuwait in April 2009

The first teaser trailer debuted in theaters with Cloverfield on January 18, 2008, which showed Enterprise under construction. Abrams himself directed the first part of the trailer, where a welder removes his goggles. Professional welders were hired for the teaser. The voices of the 1960s played over the trailer were intended to link the film to the present day; John F. Kennedy in particular was chosen because of similarities with the character of James T. Kirk and because he is seen to have "kicked off" the Space Race. Orci explained that: "If we do indeed have a Federation, I think Kennedy's words will be inscribed in there someplace." Star Trek's later trailers would win four awards, including Best in Show, in the tenth annual Golden Trailer Awards.

Paramount faced two obstacles in promoting the film: the unfamiliarity of the "MySpace generation" with the franchise and the relatively weak international performance of the previous films. Six months before the film's release, Abrams toured Europe and North America with 25 minutes of footage. Abrams noted the large-scale campaign started unusually early, but this was because the release delay allowed him to show more completed scenes than normal. The director preferred promoting his projects quietly, but concurred Paramount needed to remove Star Trek's stigma. Abrams would exaggerate his preference for other shows to Star Trek as a child to the press, with statements like "I'm not a Star Trek fan" and "this movie is not made for Star Trek fans necessarily". Orci compared Abrams' approach to The Next Generation episode "A Matter of Honor", where William Riker is stationed aboard a Klingon vessel. "On that ship when someone talks back to you, you would have to beat them down or you lose the respect of your crew, which is protocol, whereas on a Federation ship that would be a crime. So we have to give [J. J. Abrams] a little bit of leeway, when he is traveling the 'galaxy' over there where they don't know Trek, to say the things that need to be said to get people onto our side."

Promotional partners on the film include Nokia, Verizon Wireless, Esurance, Kellogg's, Burger King and Intel Corporation, as well as various companies specializing in home decorating, apparel, jewelry, gift items and "Tiberius", "Pon Farr" and "Red Shirt" fragrances. Playmates Toys, who owned the Star Trek toy license until 2000, also held the merchandise rights for the new film. The first wave was released in March and April 2009. Playmates hope to continue their toy line into 2010. The first wave consists of 3.75", 6" and 12" action figures, an Enterprise replica, prop toys and play sets. to recreate the whole bridge, one would have to buy more 3.75" figures, which come with chairs and consoles to add to the main set consisting of Kirk's chair, the floor, the main console and the viewscreen. Master Replicas, Mattel, Hasbro and Fundex Games will promote the film via playing cards, Monopoly, UNO, Scrabble, Magic 8 Ball, Hot Wheels, Tyco R/C, 20Q, Scene It? and Barbie lines. Some of these are based on previous Star Trek iterations rather than the film. CBS also created a merchandising line based around Star Trek caricatures named "Quogs".

=== Theatrical ===
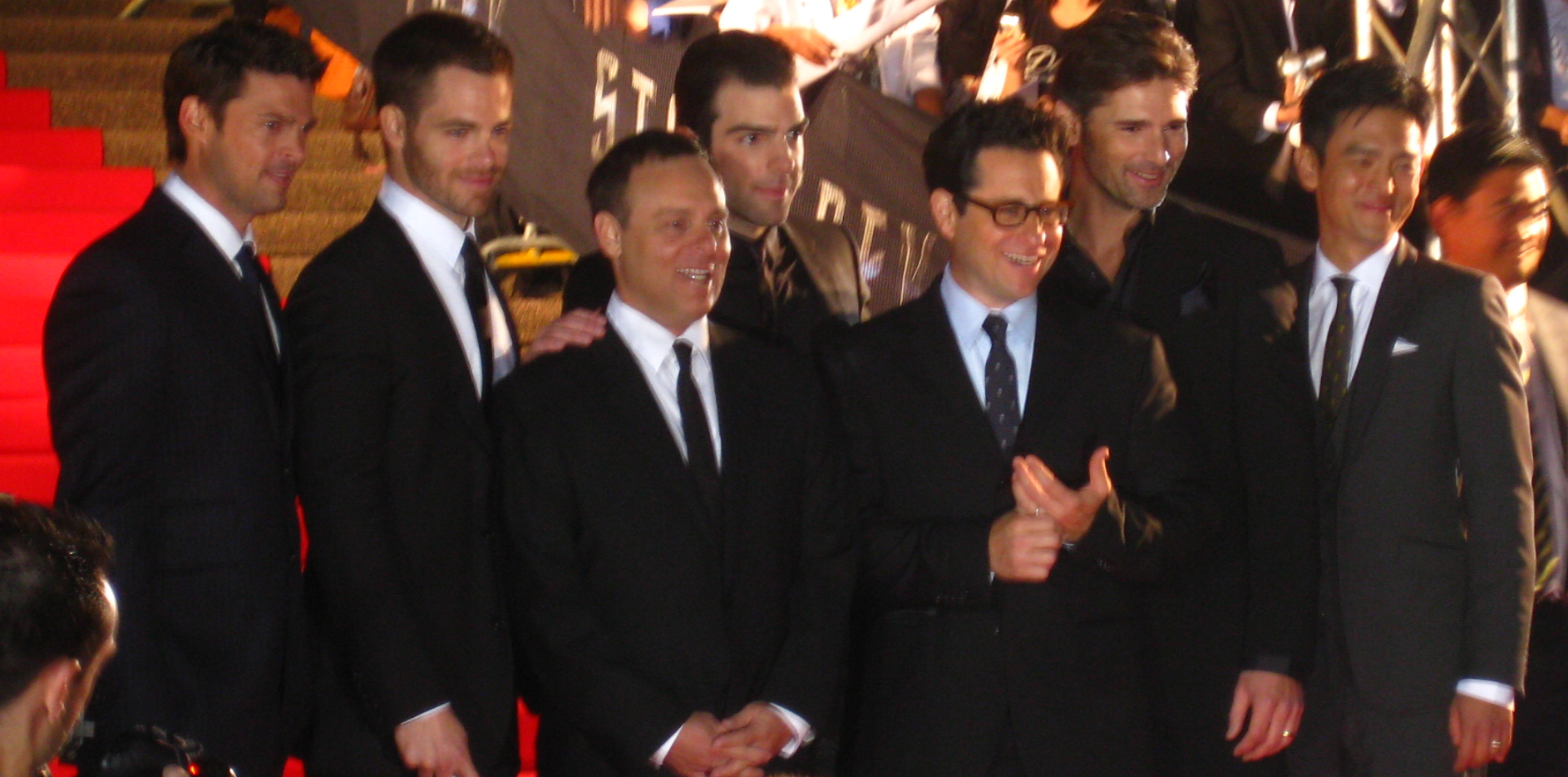
Karl Urban, Chris Pine, Bryan Burk, Zachary Quinto, J. J. Abrams, Eric Bana, and John Cho attending the film's premiere at the Sydney Opera House on April 7, 2009.

In February 2008, Paramount announced they would move Star Trek from its December 25, 2008, release date to May 8, 2009, as the studio felt more people would see the film during summer than winter. The film was practically finished by the end of 2008. Paramount's decision came about after visiting the set and watching dailies, as they realized the film could appeal to a much broader audience. Even though the filmmakers liked the Christmas release date, Damon Lindelof acknowledged it would allow more time to perfect the visual effects. The months-long gap between the completion of the production and release meant Alan Dean Foster was allowed to watch the whole film before writing the novelization, although the novel would contain scenes absent from the final edit. Quinto narrated the audiobook.

A surprise public screening was held on April 6, 2009, at the Alamo Drafthouse theater in Austin, Texas, hosted by writers Robert Orci, Alex Kurtzman, and producer Damon Lindelof. The showing was publicized as a screening of Star Trek II: The Wrath of Khan, followed by a ten-minute preview of the new Star Trek film. A few minutes into Khan, the film appeared to melt and Nimoy appeared on stage with Orci, Kurtzman and Lindelof, asking the audience, "wouldn't you rather see the new movie?" Following the surprise screening in Texas, the first of many premieres across the world was held at the Sydney Opera House in Sydney on April 7, 2009. For almost two years, the town of Vulcan, Alberta, had campaigned to have the film premiere there, but because it had no theater, Paramount arranged instead a lottery where 300 winning residents would be taken to a prerelease screening in Calgary.

=== Home media ===
The film was released on DVD and Blu-ray on November 17, 2009, in North America, November 16 in the United Kingdom and October 26 in Australia and New Zealand. In Sweden and Germany, it was released on November 4. First week sales stood at 5.7 million DVDs along with 1.1 million Blu-ray Discs, giving Paramount Pictures their third chart topping release in five weeks following Transformers: Revenge of the Fallen and G.I. Joe: The Rise of Cobra. On June 14, 2016, the film and its sequel were released on 4K Ultra HD Blu-ray. These together were Paramount's first ever 4K Blu-ray releases.

== Reception ==
=== Box office ===
Official screenings in the United States started at 7 pm on May 7, 2009, grossing $4 million on its opening day. By the end of the weekend, Star Trek had opened with $79.2 million, as well as $35.5 million from other countries. Adjusted and unadjusted for inflation, it beat Star Trek: First Contact for the largest American opening for a Star Trek film. The film made US$8.5 million from its IMAX screenings, breaking The Dark Knight's $6.3 million IMAX opening record. The film is the highest-grossing in the United States and Canada from the entire Star Trek film franchise, eclipsing The Voyage Home and Star Trek: The Motion Picture. Its opening weekend numbers alone outgross the entire individual runs of The Undiscovered Country, The Final Frontier, Insurrection and Nemesis. Star Trek ended its United States theatrical run on October 1, 2009, with a box office total of $257.7 million, which places it as the seventh highest-grossing film for 2009 behind The Hangover. The film grossed $127.8 million in international markets, for a total worldwide gross of $385.5 million. While foreign grosses represent only 31% of the total box office receipts, executives of Paramount were happy with the international sales, as Star Trek historically was a movie franchise that never has been a big draw overseas.

=== Critical response ===
On the review aggregator website Rotten Tomatoes, 94% of 351 critics' reviews are positive, with an average rating of 8.3/10. The website's consensus reads: "Star Trek reignites a classic franchise with action, humor, a strong story, and brilliant visuals, and will please traditional Trekkies and new fans alike." Metacritic, which uses a weighted average, assigned the film a score of 82 out of 100, based on 46 critics, indicating "universal acclaim". Audiences polled by CinemaScore gave the film an average grade of "A" on an A+ to F scale.

Ty Burr of the Boston Globe gave the film a perfect four star rating, describing it as "ridiculously satisfying", and the "best prequel ever". Burr praised the character development in the film, opining that "emotionally, Star Trek hits every one of its marks, functioning as a family reunion that extends across decades, entertainment mediums, even blurring the line between audience and show." He continued: "Trading on affections sustained over 40 years of popular culture, Star Trek does what a franchise reboot rarely does. It reminds us why we loved these characters in the first place." Owen Gleiberman from Entertainment Weekly gave the film an 'A−' grade, commenting that director Abrams "crafts an origin story that avoids any hint of the origin doldrums". Similar sentiments were expressed by Rolling Stone journalist Peter Travers, who gave the film a 3.5 out of 4 stars. He felt that the acting from the cast was the highlight of the filming, asserting that the performance of Pine radiated star quality. Likewise, Travers called Quinto's performance "sharp" and "intuitive", and felt that Quinto "gave the film a soul". Manohla Dargis of the New York Times wrote, "Star Trek [...] isn't just a pleasurable rethink of your geek uncle's favorite science-fiction series. It's also a testament to television's power as mythmaker, as a source for some of the fundamental stories we tell about ourselves, who we are and where we came from. Slate's Dana Stevens felt that the film was "a gift to those of us who loved the original series, that brainy, wonky, idealistic body of work that aired to almost no commercial success between 1966–69 and has since become a science fiction archetype and object of cult adoration". Time Out London's Tom Huddleston praised the aesthetic qualities of the film, such as the design of Enterprise, and praised the performances of the cast. He wrote, "The cast are equally strong: Quinto brings wry charm to an otherwise calculating character, while Pine powers through his performance in bullish, if not quite Shatner-esque, fashion."

The chemistry between Pine and Quinto was well received by critics. Gleiberman felt that as the film progressed to the conclusion, Pine and Quinto emulated the same connection as Kirk and Spock. Tim Robey of The Telegraph echoed similar attitudes; "The movie charts their relationship [...] in a nicely oblique way." Robey resumed: "It's the main event, dramatically speaking, but there's always something more thumpingly urgent to command their attention, whether it's a Vulcan distress signal or the continuing rampages of those pesky Romulans." Burr opined that Abrams had an accurate understanding of the relationship between Kirk and Spock, and wrote, "Pine makes a fine, brash boy Kirk, but Quinto's Spock is something special – an eerily calm figure freighted with a heavier sadness than Roddenberry's original. The two ground each other and point toward all the stories yet to come." Similarly, The Guardian writer Peter Bradshaw expressed: "The story of Kirk and Spock is brought thrillingly back to life by a new first generation: Chris Pine and Zachary Quinto, who give inspired, utterly unselfconscious and lovable performances, with power, passion and some cracking comic timing."

Some film critics were polarized on Star Trek. Keith Phipps of The A.V. Club gave the film a 'B+' grade, and asserted that it was "a reconsideration of what constitutes Star Trek, one that deemphasizes heady concepts and plainly stated humanist virtues in favor of breathless action punctuated by bursts of emotion. It might not even be immediately recognizable to veteran fans." In concurrence, Roger Ebert of the Chicago Sun-Times stated that "the Gene Roddenberry years, when stories might play with questions of science, ideals or philosophy, have been replaced by stories reduced to loud and colorful action." Ebert ultimately gave the film 2.5 out of 4 stars. Similarly, Marc Bain of Newsweek opined: "The latest film version of Star Trek [...] is more brawn than brain, and it largely jettisons complicated ethical conundrums in favor of action sequences and special effects." Slate journalist Juliet Lapidos argued that the new film, with its "standard Hollywood torture scene", failed to live up to the intellectual standard set by the 1992 Next Generation episode "Chain of Command", whose treatment of the issue she found both more sophisticated and pertinent to the ongoing debate over the United States' use of enhanced interrogation techniques.

A 2018 article by Io9/Gizmodo ranked all 11 versions of the USS Enterprise seen in the Star Trek franchise up to that point. The version seen in the film placed in the second lowest position.

=== Accolades ===
The film garnered numerous accolades after its release. In 2010, it was nominated for four Academy Awards at the 82nd Academy Awards, for Best Sound Editing, Best Sound, Best Visual Effects, and Best Makeup. Star Trek won in the category for Best Makeup, making it the first Star Trek film to receive an Academy Award. The film was nominated for three Empire Awards, to which it won for Best Sci-Fi/Fantasy. In October 2009, Star Trek won the Hollywood Award for Best Movie, and attained six Scream Awards at the 2009 Scream Awards Ceremony. The film attained a Screen Actors Guild Award for Outstanding Performance by a Stunt Ensemble in a Motion Picture at the 16th Screen Actors Guild Awards.

Star Trek received several nominations. The film was nominated for a Grammy Award for Best Score Soundtrack Album for a Motion Picture, Television or Other Visual Media, but was beaten out by Up, also composed by Michael Giacchino. At the 36th People's Choice Awards, the film received four nominations: the film was a contender for Favorite Movie, Zoe Saldaña was nominated for Favorite Breakout Movie Actress, and both Pine and Quinto were nominated for Favorite Breakout Movie Actor. On June 15, 2009, the film was nominated for five Teen Choice Awards. In addition, Star Trek was nominated for five Broadcast Film Critics Association Awards and was named one of the top-ten films of 2009 by the National Board of Review of Motion Pictures.

== Sequels and prequel ==
The film's major cast members signed on for two sequels as part of their original deals. Abrams and Bryan Burk signed to produce and Abrams signed to direct the first sequel. The sequel, Star Trek Into Darkness, starring Benedict Cumberbatch as Khan Noonien Singh, was released on May 15, 2013.

A third film, Star Trek Beyond, directed by Justin Lin and starring Idris Elba as the main antagonist, was released on July 22, 2016, to positive reviews. In July 2016, Abrams confirmed plans for a fourth film, and stated that Chris Hemsworth would return as Kirk's father. Most of the cast and producers of Beyond have also agreed to return; however, Abrams stated Anton Yelchin's role would not be recast following his death.

A Star Trek prequel film to the 2009 film has been announced on more than one occasion, then dropped. At one point, Lindsay Anderson Beer was attached to write a script, before the project faded away. In November 2023, actor Chris Pine told an interviewer that he was unaware of any further updates. In January 2024, Paramount released a new announcement regarding a possible prequel, saying that director Toby Haynes and scriptwriter Seth Grahame-Smith had been attached to the project.

== See also ==
- Star Trek film series
