= Spock's World =

1988 novel by Diane Duane

- Cover of the first edition
- Author: Diane Duane
- Language: English
- Genre: Science fiction
- Publication date: 1988
- Publication place: United States
- Media type: Print
- Followed by: Prime Directive

Spock's World is a 1988 science fiction novel by American writer Diane Duane, set in the fictional Star Trek universe. The plot revolves around a movement on the planet Vulcan to secede from the United Federation of Planets. The book alternates chapters that advance the main plotline with chapters that relate important scenes from Vulcan's history, and much of the book explores underlying themes in Vulcan philosophy and culture, especially the idea of cthia, a Vulcan philosophical (and possibly religious, depending on interpretation) concept translated in the book as "reality-truth — seeing things the way they really are, instead of the way we would like to see them".

== Plot synopsis ==
Certain Vulcan organizations, many with anti-human biases, have begun a movement calling for the secession of Vulcan from the United Federation of Planets, citing the emotionality and unpredictability of humans as dangerous factors for the further development of the planet Vulcan. The dispute is to be resolved by a planetwide vote, with televised debates by important figures for a certain time period beforehand. James T. Kirk and the rest of the crew of the Enterprise are called away from shore leave on Earth to serve as diplomats for Vulcan, arguing against the secession, as the odds that Vulcan will leave the Federation are considered very high. Spock, being half-human and half-Vulcan as well as a prominent Starfleet officer, is seen as one of the most important figures in the debate.

While on Vulcan, the crew discovers (mostly through detective work by Dr. Leonard McCoy, using the aid of a sentient computer named "Moira" resident on the Enterprise) that the secession movement was sparked at least partially by T'Pring, Spock's childhood bride-mate, who has nursed a grudge against Kirk and Spock for years for the deception involved in their participation in the koon-ut-kalifee ceremony (described in the original series episode "Amok Time"). Using the financial resources and connections available to her after the death of Stonn, T'Pring funded many of the organizations seeking to spark anti-human prejudice in the larger Vulcan population, as well as arranging favorable contracts for them regarding Federation property that would revert to the care of the Vulcan government should the secession take place.

Kirk, Spock, and McCoy consult heavily with Sarek, Spock's father and head ambassador from Vulcan to the Federation, and Amanda Grayson, his mother, regarding how to inform the Vulcan population of the corruption, but are interrupted by the news that T'Pau, a Vulcan elder and possibly the most respected living figure on Vulcan at that point, is dying. T'Pau makes the decision to transfer her katra (in a sense, her soul) to Amanda, instead of another Vulcan, proving her trust in certain members of the human race, and tells Kirk, Spock, McCoy, Sarek, and Amanda that since T'Pring's plot was able to thrive in secrecy and subterfuge, it should be countered with openness and honesty, and that the information should simply be given to the Vulcan population. The news of the corruption throws the planet into turmoil, but the news of her death and cross-species katra transfer brings it to a muted standstill. By this point, Kirk and McCoy (who were, with Spock, invited to participate in the debates as Starfleet representatives), have already given their arguments against secession. Spock's argument concludes the debates, and the planet votes on the secession, which is decided by a large margin in favor of remaining in the Federation.

== Continuity ==
The book, which says that Surak was killed by terrorists, is contradicted by later televised Star Trek. Star Trek: Enterprise establishes that Surak instead had been killed by radiation poisoning. The book also alludes to the prior novel Strangers from the Sky in describing first contact between Humans and Vulcans, both of which were superseded by the film Star Trek: First Contact.

== Reception ==
The novel spent eight weeks on the New York Times Best Seller list in 1988.

Ann-Marie Cahill of BookRiot.com recommend the book as "a lovely display of the importance of cultural identity and heritage with the evolution of any society; a key concept of the Star Trek Universe."

The novel is a favorite of the 2009 film's co-writer Roberto Orci. In a 2011 interview, Diane Duane stated that the pages of the book were passed out by Kurtzman and Orci to the cast.
