= Judith and Garfield Reeves-Stevens =

Canadian wife-and-husband science fiction writer duo, William Shatner co-authors

Judith Reeves-Stevens
- Born: Canada
- Occupation: Writer
- Spouse: Garfield Reeves-Stevens
- Writing career
- Genre: Science fiction

Garfield Reeves-Stevens
- Born: Canada
- Occupation: Writer
- Spouse: Judith Reeves-Stevens
- Writing career
- Genre: Science fiction

Judith and Garfield Reeves-Stevens are a Canadian husband-and-wife writing/producing team. In June, 2013, at the Constellation Awards ceremony in Toronto, the writing couple were honored with the Constellation Award for "Outstanding Canadian Contribution to Science Fiction Film or Television" for their role in creating the series, Primeval: New World.

In genre media, the Reeves-Stevenses are well known for their involvement with the Star Trek franchise. In addition to having written twenty Star Trek books, including six novels on their own, ten novels with William Shatner, and four non-fiction volumes detailing the production history of the franchise, they acted as executive story editors and co-producers on the fourth season of Star Trek: Enterprise. Both are among the series writers who had cameos in "These Are the Voyages...", the final episode of Enterprise. Previously, they acted as staff writers and executive creative consultants in the second and third seasons of Sir Arthur Conan Doyle's The Lost World, and wrote episodes of Batman: The Animated Series.

== Career ==
=== Animation ===
As executive story editors on the short-lived but highly influential Phantom 2040, they contributed to the show's creative direction, developing the writers' bible and scripting many key episodes (including the two-part pilot, Generation Unto Generation). Following Phantom 2040, produced by Hearst Entertainment Productions, the Reeves-Stevenses did additional development, wrote the writers' bible and pilot episode, and served as executive story editors for an updated Flash Gordon animated series, also from Hearst.

Among their other works in animation is Van Helsing: The London Assignment, the direct-to-DVD animé prequel to the Stephen Sommers blockbuster, for Universal Animation Studios. The DVD was released the week following the movie's opening and praised by Variety as "an excellent animated prequel... the intelligent story moves at a rapid clip and the action is nail-biting."

=== Television ===
In August, 2010, Impossible Films announced that the Reeves-Stevens would be delivering scripts for a Primeval spin-off television series as part of a franchise deal with Omni Film Productions. In a posting on their Facebook fan page, the Reeves-Stevenses stated that they were first asked by the producers if they would be interested in pitching a concept for the spin-off series in May, 2009. Being fans of the original series, the Reeves-Stevenses responded positively. Eleven months later they were invited to pitch, and subsequently were asked to write the first two scripts and the bible for the series they had described, a development process that lasted fourteen months. In September, 2011, two months after the Reeves-Stevenses had delivered their scripts and bible, Space: The Imagination Station greenlit the series, eventually titled Primeval: New World.

On February 8, 2011, the Reeves-Stevenses submitted a letter to the Canadian Radio-television and Telecommunications Commission (CRTC) in support of an application by CTVglobemedia Inc. to renew the broadcasting license of the Canadian science-fiction channel, Space: The Imagination Station. In the letter, the Reeves-Stevenses describe their involvement with the Star Trek franchise, and also discuss other science-fiction related projects, including their writing of the "critically acclaimed miniseries, Race to Mars," the dramatic story of the first human mission to Mars in the year 2031, for which they worked with more than seventy scientific and technical advisors. The Toronto Star praised the Discovery Channel miniseries as "a tautly written tale that simply zings with tension… a dramatic winner."

=== NASA Space Policy Workshop ===
Other projects to which they refer in the CRTC letter include their involvement in a NASA Space Policy Workshop of "distinguished forward-thinking individuals to bring new perspectives and new ideas into the debate" to produce a new vision for America's future goals in space. The couple joined with sixteen other participants to meet with top NASA officials, including NASA Administrator Sean O'Keefe, Director of the Jet Propulsion Laboratory, Dr. Charles Elachi, NASA Associate Administrator for Science, Ed Weiler, and NASA Chief Scientist, astronaut John Grunsfeld. Other members of the committee included filmmakers James Cameron and George Butler, Segway inventor Dean Kamen, astrophysicist Kip Thorne, and Steve Squyres, lead scientist for the Mars Exploration Rovers Spirit and Opportunity.

=== Work with the Disney Imagineers ===
The letter concludes with the Reeves-Stevenses mentioning their then-current position as Lead "Land" Writers for the Walt Disney Imagineers, helping to plan the rides and attractions for the new Shanghai Disneyland which opened in June, 2016. Most recently with the Imagineers, they have been involved in creating entire park concepts and future attractions for Disney Asia, as well as working as Lead Story Consultants for the 40th Anniversary of EPCOT, for 2022.

=== Phoenix Rising ===
On September 28, 2012, Ain't It Cool News reported that the Reeves-Stevenses had been enlisted to develop "the next evolution" of the hit cult television series, Captain Power and the Soldiers of the Future. In the video accompanying the report, the Reeves-Stevenses are credited with having delivered a one-hour "premise pilot" and bible for the new version of the series, now titled Phoenix Rising.

=== Features ===
In October, 2013, the IMDbPro site reported that the Reeves-Stevenses had written the screenplay for the movie adaptation of Jerry Pournelle's classic military science-fiction novel, Janissaries. The movie is listed as "In Development" with Lay-Carnagey Entertainment.

In January, 2016, the official website for Andre Norton announced that the Estate has entered into a deal to turn the first two Witch World novels into a movie. The announcement included a statement from the film's producers, Kirin Media Ventures, stating "The Producers are happy to announce that they have developed a new Witch World script that they are very excited about, written by award-winning screenwriters Judith and Garfield Reeves-Stevens (Janissaries, Star Trek: Enterprise). This script forms the basis of the first movie in a new film trilogy based on the classic Witch World book series by Andre."

The Reeves-Stevenses have also written the screenplay for Furnace, based on the young adult, horror sci-fi novel series, Escape from Furnace, written by Alexander Gordon Smith.

In March, 2018, Universal Pictures Home Entertainment released Aliens Ate My Homework, a suspenseful family comedy written by Judith and Garfield, based on the book by Bruce Coville. The live-action movie stars William Shatner as the voice of Phillogenous Esk Piemondum, the talking plant who pilots the Galactic Patrol Starship Ferkel. The book is the first in a four-book series and the Reeves-Stevenses have reported they "are now at work on the sequel, I Left My Sneakers in Dimension X."

=== Novels ===
In addition to their ongoing work in features and television, the Reeves-Stevenses most recent novel is Wraith, from Thomas Dunne Books, an imprint of St. Martin's Press. Publishers Weekly praised the book, saying, "Speculative fiction fans will welcome this cataclysmic thriller featuring zombies, disembodied psychics, and undead armies... The Reeves-Stevenses (Freefall) sharpen the pulp theatrics with deft characterization, rich atmosphere, and sly condemnations of present-day American culture."

Their previous novel, also published by Thomas Dunne Books, was Search, billed as a novel of "forbidden history." Publishers Weekly called the novel a "...fine archaeological quest novel [that] smoothly blends a fast-moving fantasy plot with a solid scientific backdrop... Smart, suspenseful writing and a clever concept add up to a compelling read."

Among their other novels are the connected techno-thrillers, Icefire, Quicksilver, and Freefall. The first novel in the series, about a terrorist act that causes the collapse of the Ross Ice Shelf to create a devastating tsunami, was praised by Stephen King as "a hardwired, totally riveting, dare-you-to-put-it-down story of disaster, heroism, and suspense. There's no need for techno-thriller fans to wait for the next Clancy or Coonts; Icefire is the best suspense novel of its type since The Hunt for Red October."

Before branching into Star Trek, fantasy, and mainstream thrillers with Judith, Garfield wrote five novels blending horror and technology, prompting Stephen King to say, "Garfield Reeves-Stevens is the Tom Clancy of horror." One of those novels, Children of the Shroud, is credited by New York Magazine as being the first to feature a storyline based on cloning Jesus.

== Bibliography ==
=== Star Trek ===
- Memory Prime (October 1988)
- Prime Directive (September 1990)
- Federation (November 1994)
- Star Trek: Deep Space Nine: The Lives of Dax (December 1999)
  - Ezri: "Second star to the right..."
  - Ezri: "...and straight on 'til morning."
- Star Trek: Deep Space Nine: Millennium
  - Book I of III: The Fall of Terok Nor (March 2000)
  - Book II of III: The War of the Prophets (March 2000)
  - Book III of III: Inferno (April 2000)
- With William Shatner
  - The Ashes of Eden (June 1995)
  - The Return (April 1996)
  - Avenger (May 1997)
  - Spectre (May 1998)
  - Dark Victory (April 2000)
  - Preserver (April 2001)
  - Captain's Peril (October 2002)
  - Captain's Blood (December 2003)
  - Captain's Glory (August 2006)
  - Academy - Collision Course (October 2007)
- Star Trek Non-Fiction
  - The Making of Star Trek: Deep Space Nine (December 1994)
  - The Art of Star Trek (November 1995)
  - Star Trek: Phase II - The Lost Series (March 1997)
  - Star Trek: The Next Generation - The Continuing Mission (October 1998)

=== Non-Star Trek science fiction ===
- The Chronicles of Galen Sword
  - Shifter (July 1990)
  - Nightfeeder (April 1991)
  - Dark Hunter (November 2003)
- Alien Nation: The Day of Descent (1993)
- Short stories
  - "CHIPS" (First published in Shivers: Canadian Tales of the Supernatural, 1990)
  - "Bluebound: From the Chronicles of Galen Sword" (First published in Chilled to the Bone, 1991)
  - "One Last Night in the Mos Eisley Cantina: The Tale of the Wolfman and the Lamproid" (First published in Star Wars: Tales from the Mos Eisley Cantina, 1995)
  - "A Bad Feeling: The Tale of EV-9D9" (First published in Star Wars: Tales from Jabba's Palace, 1996)
  - "things in jars" (First published in Expiration Date, 2015)

=== Mainstream fiction ===
- Icefire (July 1998)
- Quicksilver (May 1999)
- Freefall (March 2005)
- Search (August 2010)
- Wraith (April 2016)

=== Mainstream non-fiction ===
- Going to Mars: The Stories of the People Behind NASA's Mars Missions Past, Present, and Future (Co-authored with Brian Muirhead, November 2004)

=== Fiction written only by Garfield ===
- Bloodshift (1981)
- Dreamland (1985)
- Children of the Shroud (1987)
- Nighteyes (1989)
- Dark Matter (1990)
- Short stories
  - "August" (First published in Shivers: Canadian Tales of the Supernatural, 1990)
  - "Masks" (First published in The Further Adventures of The Joker, 1990)
  - "Part Five" (First published in The Ultimate Frankenstein, 1991)
  - "Outport" (First published in Ark of Ice: Canadian Futurefiction, 1992)
  - "Tear Down" (First published in Northern Frights, 1992)
  - "The Warrior of the Final Dawn" (First published in The Further Adventures of Superman, 1993)
  - "The Eddies" (First published in Northern Frights 2, 1994)

== Writing credits ==
Production	Notes	Broadcaster
CBS Schoolbreak Special	"Maggie's Secret" (1990)	CBS
Catwalk	"Words and Music" (1992); "Downtown" (1993); "Flipside" (1993); "Sex, Lies and Rock 'n' Roll" (1993)	YTV
Beyond Reality	"Final Flight" (1992); "Forget Me Not" (1993); "The Box" (1993)	CTV
Batman: The Animated Series	"The Strange Secret of Bruce Wayne" (1992); "Dreams in Darkness" (1992); "Fire from Olympus" (1993)	Fox
The Legend of Prince Valiant	"The Jubilee" (1993); "The Hero" (1993); "The Aurora" (1993); "The Burning Bridge" (1993); "The Sage" (1993); "The Song of Valor" (1993); "The Ring of Truth" (1993)	The Family Channel
David Copperfield	Television film (1993)	NBC
Phantom 2040	18 episodes (1994–1996)	Syndicated
Flash Gordon	"Vandals from the Void" (1996)	YTV
Mighty Ducks	"Monster Rally" (1996)	ABC
Mighty Ducks the Movie: The First Face-Off	Non-theatrical animated feature film (1997)	N/A
Shadow Zone: My Teacher Ate My Homework	Television film (1997)	Showtime
The Lost World	15 episodes (2001–2002)	Syndicated
Van Helsing: The London Assignment	DVD animated film (2004)	N/A
G.I. Joe: Valor vs. Venom	DVD animated film (2004)	N/A
G.I. Joe: Ninja Battles	DVD animated film (2004)	N/A
Star Trek: Enterprise	"The Forge" (2004); "Observer Effect" (2005); "United" (2005); "Divergence" (2005); "Terra Prime" (2005)	UPN
Action Man: The Movie	DVD animated film (2005)	N/A
Fire Serpent	Television film (2007)	N/A
Race to Mars	Television mini-series (2007)	Discovery
Primeval: New World	13 episodes (2012–2013)	Space

== Awards and nominations ==
Year	Award	Work	Category	Result
1991	Daytime Emmy Award	CBS Schoolbreak Special: "Maggie's Secret"(shared with Dennis Foon)	Outstanding Writing in a Children's Special	Nominated
