= Mechamorphosis =

Tabletop role-playing game

- Cover
- Designers: Lysle Kapp, Rob Vaughn
- Publishers: Fantasy Flight Games
- Publication: 2004
- Genres: Giant robot
- Systems: d20 System
- ISBN: 9781589941847

This article describes the game by role-playing game. "Mechamorphosis" is also used to refer to the transformation of robots in fiction relating to the Robotech anime setting; primarily in the novelizations written by Jack McKinney.

Mechamorphosis is a Transformers-like role-playing game based on the d20 System created by Lysle Kapp and Rob Vaughn of Fantasy Flight Games (FFG). The game, released in 2004, is the fifth of FFG's Horizon minigames. The manual describing the game is 64 pages long. The game allows players to take on the roles of giant transforming robots set within the storyline of FFG's homebrew variation on Hasbro's Transformers toyline. Most of its game mechanisms are Open gaming content released under the Open Gaming License (OGL).

== Reviews ==
- Pyramid
- Backstab #49

== See also ==
- Doom Striders
