= Icefire =

Icefire may refer to:

- Icefire (2003 novel), a 2003 children's fantasy novel by Chris d'Lacey
- Icefire (1998 novel), a novel by Garfield and Judith Reeves-Stevens
