= The Ashes of Eden =

1995 novel

Ashes of Eden
- Authors: William Shatner, Judith Reeves-Stevens, Garfield Reeves-Stevens
- Cover artist: Bryan D. Allen
- Language: English
- Series: Pocket TOS
- Genre: Science fiction
- Publisher: Pocket Books
- Publication date: June 1, 1995 (1st edition)
- Publication place: United States
- Media type: Print (Hardcover)
- Pages: 309 (Hardcover 1st edition)
- ISBN: 978-0-671-52035-9 (Hardcover 1st edition)
- OCLC: 32420904
- Dewey Decimal: 813/.54 20
- LC Class: PS3569.H347 S7 1995
- Followed by: The Return

The Ashes of Eden is a science fiction novel part of the Star Trek franchise, co-written by Canadian actor William Shatner in collaboration with Canadian authors Judith Reeves-Stevens, and Garfield Reeves-Stevens as part of the "Shatnerverse" series of novels. This is Shatner's first Trek collaboration.

The audio adaptation of the book includes the first time in the entire Star Trek franchise in which the phrase "Beam me up, Scotty" is uttered in that form.

== Plot summary ==
Following the Khitomer Conference, a disillusioned James T. Kirk resigns from Starfleet and accepts an offer from a mysterious woman named Teilani to help protect her homeworld, Chal. Backed by Starfleet engineers who believe they are merely restoring a mothballed starship, Kirk and Scotty take command of the decommissioned USS Enterprise-A on behalf of the planet.

However, Kirk discovers a corrupt conspiracy involving rogue Starfleet and Klingon factions. They intend to exploit Chal for its planetary, youth-restoring properties. Confronting the betrayal, Kirk works alongside his former crew to thwart the plot. The conflict culminates in a fierce space battle, resulting in the destruction of the USS Enterprise-A to save the planet.

== Characters ==
- James T. Kirk
- Spock
- Leonard McCoy
- Scotty
- Hikaru Sulu
- Pavel Chekov
- Uhura
- William Riker
- Carol Marcus
- Androvar Drake
- Galt
- Faith Morgan
- Teilani

== Production ==
Following the publication of their book Federation, Judith and Garfield Reeves-Stevens were contacted by Pocket Books editor Kevin Ryan. He was asking about whether they would be interested in collaborating with William Shatner on a new book. Shatner had just completed filming as James T. Kirk on the film Star Trek Generations which showed the death of his character. Both Shatner and Pocket Books wanted the character's story to continue in novel form. The novel was set immediately prior to the events of Generations. After the trio submitted the manuscript to Pocket Books, the response was positive and wanted to know if a sequel was possible.

== Comics ==
DC Comics published a one-shot graphic novel adaptation of this novel in 1995, with writing credit of William Shatner with Judith & Garfield Reeves-Stevens.

== Release details ==
- William Shatner, Judith Reeves-Stevens and Garfield Reeves-Stevens, The Ashes of Eden (Star Trek), Pocket Books June 1995, ISBN 978-0-671-52035-9, Hardcover
- William Shatner, Judith Reeves-Stevens and Garfield Reeves-Stevens, The Ashes of Eden (Star Trek), Star Trek; Reissue edition 1996, ISBN 978-0-671-52036-6, Paperback
