= Prime Directive (disambiguation) =

The Prime Directive is a guiding principle of Starfleet, an organization in the fictional universe of the Star Trek media franchise.

Prime Directive may also refer to:

- Prime Directive (role-playing game), by the Amarillo Design Bureau
- Prime Directive (album), a 1999 album by the Dave Holland Quintet
- Prime Directive (novel), a 1990 Star Trek novel by Judith and Garfield Reeves-Stevens
- Prime directive (RoboCop), four rules governing the behavior of RoboCop in the fictional media franchise
- A fake working title of the Transformers (film series)
- Prime Directive, a concept in the 1947 science fiction novelette "With Folded Hands ..." by Jack Williamson
