= The Chronicles of Galen Sword =

- Shifter; Nightfeeder; Dark Hunter
- Author: Judith and Garfield Reeves-Stevens
- Country: United States
- Language: English
- Genre: Science fiction, fantasy
- Publisher: Roc, Babbage Press
- Published: 1990, 1991, 2003
- No. of books: 3

The Chronicles of Galen Sword is a science fiction/fantasy trilogy book series written by New York Times-bestselling husband-and-wife Judith and Garfield Reeves-Stevens. The trilogy consists of Shifter, published in 1990 by Roc Books, a fantasy imprint of Penguin Group, Nightfeeder, published by Roc Books in 1991, and Dark Hunter published by Babbage Press in 2003. The books follow the adventure of Galen Sword, a young rich New York City playboy, as he tries to return to a world of vampires, werewolves, and sorcerers; he was exiled among humans as a child, grew up an orphan, and a car accident prompts his quest. The authors are better known for writing Star Trek novels, and TV episodes of Star Trek: Enterprise, Sir Arthur Conan Doyle's Lost World, Race to Mars, and Batman.
