= Dark Matter (Reeves-Stevens novel) =

1990 science fiction novel by Garfield Reeves-Stevens

- First edition cover (Doubleday Books)
- Author: Garfield Reeves-Stevens
- Genre: Science fiction
- Publisher: Doubleday Books
- Publication date: October 19, 1990
- ISBN: 978-0-385-24756-6

Dark Matter is the title of a 1990 science fiction novel by Canadian writer Garfield Reeves-Stevens. It involves mystery, horror, and physics, and was first published by Doubleday in September 1990.
