= Federation (novel) =

Star Trek novel by Judith and Garfield Reeves-Stevens

- Author: Judith and Garfield Reeves-Stevens
- Illustrator: Keith Birdsong
- Genre: Science fiction
- Publisher: Simon and Schuster
- Publication date: 1 November 1994
- Media type: Print
- ISBN: 0671894226
- Preceded by: Sarek
- Followed by: Star Trek Generations (novel)

Federation (1994) is a science fiction novel written by Judith and Garfield Reeves-Stevens. It is a tie-together chronicle that brings the original Enterprise adventures of James T. Kirk close to an encounter with the Enterprise-D adventures of Jean-Luc Picard.

== Plot summary ==
The first half of the novel involves three parallel arcs. In one arc, Zefram Cochrane has just completed the first warp speed voyage, a solo journey to Alpha Centauri and back. His is the first successful crewed flight beyond the Sol system. His benefactor and backer, Micah Brack, exploits the warp drive to help humanity burst into the stars and safeguard the future of the race, which he foresees disaster for because of the "Optimum Movement", perfectionists who are trying to perfect Khan Noonien Singh's failed attempt to unify and improve humanity.

A second arc covers James Kirk and his crew, just after the successful conference on admitting Coridan into the Federation. Kirk is hauled onto the carpet by a Starfleet admiral demanding that he explain a subspace message showing "dead" Commissioner Nancy Hedford. Kirk discovers that Cochrane was kidnapped from his and Nancy's home at Gamma Canaris.

A third arc covers Jean-Luc Picard and his crew, just after dropping off Sarek of Vulcan to another ship for his voyage home from the Legaran home world. A Ferengi ship leads them to a Romulan ship, whose commander is giving Picard what appears to be a section of a Borg ship, but with a Preserver artifact incorporated into it.

The Cochrane arc jumps ahead 17 years, from 2061 to 2078, just before a devastating war on Earth and long after Micah Brack's mysterious disappearance. Cochrane risked visiting his home planet, and narrowly escaped the forces of the Optimum Movement whose leader, Adrik Thorsen, wants Cochrane's knowledge about warp fields to create a bomb. The Cochrane arc then jumps further to 2111, when he must flee Alpha Centauri, and begins his voyage into the future when the Companion finds him and takes him to a sanctuary, her home.

Kirk and the Enterprise find the hijacked passenger ship that has Cochrane aboard, and cleverly rescue all aboard. However, they are in a battle with Klingon warships under the command of the robotic remnants of Thorsen, and the Enterprise is damaged. Cochrane and the Companion board a shuttlecraft that will take "shelter" inside the event horizon of a black hole, on a course calculated to bring them out again using a short burst of warp drive. However, one Klingon ship follows the shuttlecraft, and Kirk takes the Enterprise in, dispatching the Klingon ship with one torpedo. They cannot, however, now escape and the shuttlecraft is also doomed.

Picard's crew study the Preserver artifact, and when Data tries to interface with it, Thorsen's essence emerges from the artifact and takes over Data. Data takes the Enterprise into the black hole where Thorsen saw Cochrane enter it a century before. The two Enterprises, once Data's body is shut off, coordinate to take advantage of gravity waves to save both ships and tractor the shuttlecraft out. By necessity, to emerge in their own times, Kirk's Enterprise must yield the shuttlecraft's mass to Picard's, and so when Picard and the Enterprise-D emerge, they find the shuttlecraft holds Zefram Cochrane and Nancy Hedford/Companion. Both of them die, even as the ship arrives at Gamma Canaris to find the planetoid has long ago disintegrated.

Before the ships got too far apart, Picard sent a short signal identifying his ship by name. Kirk writes a letter on paper to the captain of that future Enterprise, to be released after certain events have occurred. Picard is given the letter not long after the Enterprise-D is lost on Veridian III.

One of the common ties is Christopher's Landing, the location on the moon Titan where Sean Jeffrey Christopher made humanity's first landing on the moon of Saturn. Cochrane returned there after his successful warp flight; Kirk writes his letter there and Picard is given that letter. Over the course of 300 years... 2061 to 2265 to 2366... the environment of Titan is progressively terraformed to one where Picard is able to stroll outdoors.

The events of the story were non-canonical, and conflict with what was established about Zefram Cochrane, his first warp flight, and first contact with the Vulcans, in the 1996 film Star Trek: First Contact.

== Reception ==
In 2015, John Bardinelli of Barnesandnoble.com highlighted this as among of the best Star Trek novels, he praised it for tying together the crews from both the original series and The Next Generation and said "Federation is one of the best-written, most entertaining books in the shared universe.".

The book appeared on the New York Times best seller list.
