= Icefire (Reeves-Stevens novel) =

1998 novel by Garfield and Judith Reeves-Stevens

- First edition cover
- Author: Judith and Garfield Reeves-Stevens
- Publisher: Pocket Books
- Publication date: July 1, 1998
- ISBN: 0-671-01402-1

Icefire (1998) is a novel written by Canadian writers Judith and Garfield Reeves-Stevens.

== Plot ==
Icefire is an action/science fiction novel about an unknown group using the Ross Ice Shelf to create a soliton wave—much more powerful and destructive than tsunamis caused by seismic displacement—directed into the Pacific Ocean. Roughly the size of France, the Ross Ice Shelf is first broken free of its shoreline anchor points by tactical nuclear weapons detonated around its periphery. A larger nuclear device is then airburst above the Shelf, slamming the entire mass of loose ice into the Ross Sea beneath it and generating the monster wave.

The EMP from the airburst warhead disables most electronics within its line of sight, blinding the world's satellites and silencing radio communication from the area.

The main protagonists, Mitch Webber and Cory Rey, must escape the communication dead zone in time to tell the world what happened, warn everyone of the deadly wave racing towards it, discover who set it in motion, and find a way to catch the villains and stop the wave—if they can.

The destruction caused by the bombs and people's understandable skepticism are working against them as, with every passing second, the wave gets closer to major cities and their unsuspecting populations.
