= The Return (Shatner novel) =

1996 novel by William Shatner

- Authors: William Shatner, with Garfield Reeves-Stevens and Judith Reeves-Stevens
- Original title: The Fires of Olympus
- Language: English
- Genre: Science fiction
- Publisher: Pocket Books (U.S.)
- Publication date: April 1996 (U.S.)
- Publication place: United States
- Media type: Paperback, hardback, audio cassette
- Pages: 371 p. (US paperback edition)
- ISBN: 0-671-52610-3 (US hardback edition) & ISBN 0-671-52609-X (US paperback edition)
- OCLC: 34348851
- Dewey Decimal: 813/.54 20
- LC Class: PS3569.H347 S73 1996
- Preceded by: The Ashes of Eden
- Followed by: Avenger

The Return is a novel by William Shatner that was co-written with Garfield Reeves-Stevens and Judith Reeves-Stevens. It is set in the Star Trek universe but, as part of the "Shatnerverse," does not follow the timeline established by other Star Trek novels. The book's sequel is Avenger.

== Plot summary ==
The novel begins on the planet Veridian III and takes place shortly after the events seen in the motion picture Star Trek Generations. The body of James T. Kirk is stolen by the Romulans after his burial by fellow Starfleet captain Jean-Luc Picard. The Borg have formed an alliance with the Romulan Star Empire in order to destroy the Federation. Using alien technology, the Borg bring Kirk back to life and his katra is restored, but false memories are implanted to turn him against the Federation. The goal of this secret alliance is to destroy Picard and therefore Starfleet's only defense against the Borg but, despite his conditioning, Kirk is able to resist commands to kill Worf, Data, and Geordi La Forge, all of whom are attacked by him during his search for Picard.

Simultaneously, Picard and Dr. Beverly Crusher are participating in a strike team in a Federation expedition to an assimilated colony, where they are forced to sneak on board the fleeing Borg vessel. While on board, they are able to move freely around the vessel and they learn of the Borg/Romulan Alliance. Spock also learns of this alliance when he is captured dealing with Romulans, but the Borg do not assimilate him as, for some reason, they believe Spock is already Borg.

Kirk is eventually captured on Deep Space Nine attempting to kill Commander William Riker, and the implant that was responsible for his false memories is removed by the joint efforts of Dr. Julian Bashir and Admiral Leonard McCoy; McCoy acts as an advisor during the surgery while Bashir's younger, fitter hands perform the operation. Although Kirk retains the drives implanted in him by the device, leading him to a confrontation with Picard in a holodeck re-creation of the original USS Enterprise, Spock is able to remove the commands thanks to a mind meld. In the process, they learn that V'ger, the former Voyager 6, was actually upgraded by a division of the Borg Collective, which explains why the Borg did not assimilate Spock; they assumed the trace of V'ger in his mind from their meld (in Star Trek: The Motion Picture) was an actual link to the Collective. This also gives Starfleet another advantage; thanks to the meld, Spock knows the location of the Borg homeworld.

Taking a Defiant-class starship (renamed Enterprise for the mission), the Enterprise-D senior staff, accompanied by Kirk, Spock and McCoy, travel directly to the Borg homeworld thanks to a stolen transwarp drive. Once there, the Enterprise neutralizes the Borg/Romulan fleet around the planet with a wave, dampening the Borg's communication and making them unable to maintain their link to the Collective, effectively neutralizing them. Taking this as a distraction, Kirk and Picard beam down to the planet in search of the Borg central node. Using Picard's memories as Locutus, they track down the Borg central node which, when deactivated, will sever the Borg Collective; every Borg ship will be separate from every other ship, and what can defeat one will always work a second time. However, the result will cause a cataclysmic explosion that will kill whoever operates the node.

Picard and Kirk debate on who will go, each attempting to be the hero and sacrifice himself. Kirk appears to give in and let Picard pull the lever, but he takes the sudden calm to knock Picard out and beam his unconscious body back up to the Enterprise. Kirk then pulls the lever and triggers the explosion. However, even as the crew watches, Spock, who has always been able to sense Kirk ever since they first mind-melded, still does not believe that his friend is dead.

== Background ==
The working title for the book was The Fires of Olympus.

== Reception ==
Gideon Kibblewhite reviewed The Return for Arcane magazine, rating it a 5 out of 10 overall. Kibblewhite comments that "There is enough pace and action, enough in-jokes, enough of wide-eyed Kirk whispering 'Spock!' fiercely (yes, all the old favourites are wheeled on literally, in one case), and quite enough of Kirk rolling around as if he was 30, but not one new idea, character or race is introduced."

The Hour reviewed the audiobook version, noting that Shatner's performance with the character voices was somewhat inconsistent. Overall, the book was said to be "a worthy sequel" and "an enjoyable experience for "Star Trek" fans."

The novel was number four on The New York Times Best Seller list's and number three on The Wall Street Journal's Best Seller list.

== Reviews ==
- Review by Neil Jones (1996) in Interzone, #108 June 1996

== See also ==
- List of Star Trek novels
