= Airship (company) =

American mobile app messaging company

- Type: Private Corporation
- Founded: 2009; 17 years ago
- Founder: Steven Osborn, Scott Kveton, Adam Lowry, Michael Richardson
- Headquarters: San Francisco, California
- Products: Advertisements, Analytics
- Website: www.airship.com

Airship (software company), formerly Urban Airship, is a San Francisco, California-based company founded in Portland, Oregon, that offers mobile customer experience and messaging services. The company is best known for its push notification technology that enables businesses to deliver targeted messages to mobile app users. In addition to push notifications, the company's software supports messaging across multiple digital channels, including SMS and in-app communications, as well as tools for analytics, experimentation, and automation.

As of November 2020, Airship has offices in Portland, San Francisco, Santa Barbara, New York City, London, Paris, New Delhi, Munich, and Singapore.

== History ==
In 2009, Urban Airship was founded by Steven Osborn, Scott Kveton, Adam Lowry, and Michael Richardson. The company received $1.1 million in Series A funding in February 2010, and then received $5.4 million in Series B funding in November of the same year. On November 5, 2011, Airship received $15.1 million in Series C funding from Salesforce.com, Intel, and Verizon, among others.

On February 6, 2013, the company announced additional funding of $25 million from Foundry Group, Intel Capital, True Ventures and Verizon. In October 2014, Airship announced another $12.1 million in Series D funding from existing investors. In February 2015, the company picked up an additional $9 million in venture funding, bringing total funding to $67.6 million. In September 2015, the company released Urban Airship Connect, a platform for collecting data from mobile apps and sharing it with other business systems. In June 2018, Airship completed an F round of funding at $25 million led by Foundry Group.

In July 2014, Scott Kveton stepped down as CEO. In October of that same year, Brett Caine was hired as CEO. Caine was previously the president of Citrix Online. In November 2016, Airship launched two messaging APIs Open Channels and Open Profiles.

In March 2018, Airship released interactive and automated in-app messages. In June 2018, the company completed an F round of funding at $25 million led by Foundry Group. In August 2018, Urban Airship introduced Boost, a service for delivering mobile notifications with reduced latency. During the 2018 FIFA World Cup final, the company reported a peak delivery rate of 400,000 notifications per second. Onefootball, a sports news platform, utilized the service to send more than five billion notifications during the tournament. In September of the same year, Airship released beta SDK for iOS.

In June 2019, the company rebranded as Airship (formally being Urban Airship).

In 2025, Airship was included in the Gartner Magic Quadrant for Multichannel Marketing Hubs.

== Acquisitions ==
Airship acquired SimpleGeo on October 31, 2011 for a reported $3.5 million. Airship discontinued SimpleGeo services on March 31, 2012.

In December 2012, Airship acquired Tello, another True Ventures-backed startup. Airship acquired Tello in an all-stock deal in order to integrate PassTools, Tello's Apple Passbook management product, into its current offering.

The company purchased SMS commerce company, ReplyBuy in September 2020 for an undisclosed amount.

In January 2019, Airship acquired Accenage, a larger mobile customer relationship management provider based in Paris. In August 2019, Airship acquired Apptimize, a user experience testing company based in San Francisco, California.

In 2022, Airship acquired Gummicube, an app store optimization company, adding Apple App Store and Google Play search data to its platform.
