= Guildcraft =

Guildcraft is a 2002 supplement for d20 System role-playing games published by Bastion Press.

== Contents ==
Guildcraft is a supplement in which a comprehensive toolkit for integrating powerful, story‑shaping guilds into a campaign presents dozens of class-, skill-, and faction‑based guilds with mechanical benefits, plus guidelines, feats, and prestige classes.

== Reviews ==
- Pyramid
- Fictional Reality (Issue 11 - Mar 2003)
- d20Zine #4 (March, 2003)
