= Airship (ballad) =

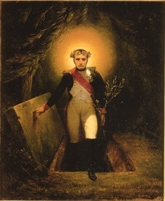
- Napoleon Rising Out of His Tomb, by Horace Vernet
- Author: Mikhail Lermontov
- Original title: «Возду́шный кора́бль. Из Це́длица»
- Language: Russian
- Series: Napoleonic cycle Lermontov's poems
- Genre: Romantic drama
- Publication date: 1840
- Publication place: Russian Empire

«Airship. From Zedlitz» («On the blue waves of the ocean ... ») (Russian: «Возду́шный кора́бль. Из Це́длица» («По синим волнам океана…»)) is a ballad from the Napoleonic cycle Lermontov's poems, written and published in 1840. It is a free translation from the German language Austrian romantic writings of Joseph Christian Freiherr von Zedlitz, titled Das Geisterschiff ("ghost ship", 1832). The individual fragments of Russian poem were influenced by another ballad of the same Austrian author - "Night parade" (Die nächtliche Heerschau; 1827), published in Russian in 1836 in translation by Zhukovsky.

== Illustrations ==
The poem was illustrated by Veniamin Belkin, Ivan Bilibin, V.I. Komarov, Vladimir Konashevich (ed.), Dmitry Mitrohin, L.M. Nepomnyashchii, Leonid Pasternak, Vardges Sureniants, Paul Chmaroff and others.

== Literature ==
- Lermontov encyclopedia. Moscow: Soviet Encyclopedia. 1981. p. 746.
- Lermontov in music. Directory. Moscow: Soviet composer. 1983. p. 176.
