= Shatnerverse =

Science fiction novels by William Shatner

- Cover art of Dark Victory
- Author: William Shatner; Judith and Garfield Reeves-Stevens
- Country: United States
- Language: English
- Genre: Science fiction
- Publisher: Pocket Books
- Published: 1995 – 2007
- Media type: Print (Hardback)
- No. of books: 9, 1 tie-in

The Shatnerverse is the informal, fannish nickname given to a series of loosely connected Star Trek novels written by William Shatner, with co-writers Judith and Garfield Reeves-Stevens. The novels were conceived by Shatner during the filming of Star Trek Generations. Published from 1995 to 2007 by Pocket Books, each novel features Shatner's James T. Kirk in scenarios Den of Geek described as "goofy and self-indulgent", yet Shatner's bluster as Captain Kirk "is part of his charm".

== Development ==
The series explores James T. Kirk's life after the events of Star Trek Generations (1994). Conceived by William Shatner while filming his character's final scenes, the novels were co-written by Judith and Garfield Reeves-Stevens who were not credited until Captain's Peril (2002). Six novels were published by Shatner and the Reeves-Stevenses from 1995 to 2006.

Pocket Books marketed the novels under the star Star Trek name, however the continuity within the series is independent of other Star Trek book lines. Star Trek fans coined the name "Shatnerverse" which was adopted by unofficial sources. Fans also grouped the novels into three unofficial trilogies: "Odyssey", "Mirror Universe", and "Totality".

Preserver (2000) was inspired by Shatner's experience following the death of his wife.

The related novel, Collision Course (2007), was the launch title of a proposed Star Trek: Academy series but the planned sequels were canceled following poor sales of Collision Course.

== Novels ==
The novels are organized into three unofficial trilogies. Numbering of the novels varies by language and market.

=== Odyssey ===
The trilogy's name is taken from an omnibus edition originally planned as a Science Fiction Book Club exclusive.

Title	Author	Date	ISBN
The Ashes of Eden	William Shatner	June 1995	0-671-52035-0
The Return	William Shatner	April 1996	0-671-52610-3
Avenger	William Shatner	May 1997	0-671-55132-9
Odyssey (omnibus)	William Shatner	September 1998	0-671-02547-3

=== Mirror Universe ===
Novels set primarily in Star Trek's Mirror Universe.

Title	Author	Date	ISBN
Spectre	William Shatner	May 1998	0-671-00878-1
Dark Victory	William Shatner	April 1999	0-671-00882-X
Preserver	William Shatner	July 2000	0-671-02125-7

=== Totality ===
Also known as the Captain Kirk or Captain's trilogy.

Title	Author(s)	Date	ISBN
Captain's Peril	William Shatner, with Judith and Garfield Reeves-Stevens	October 8, 2002	0-7434-4819-7
Captain's Blood	William Shatner, with Judith and Garfield Reeves-Stevens	December 9, 2003	0-671-02129-X
Captain's Glory	William Shatner, with Judith and Garfield Reeves-Stevens	August 22, 2006	0-7434-5343-3

== Reception ==
Den of Geek wrote the "Shatnerverse" novels are "very goofy and self-indulgent", yet they are a fun continuation of The Original Series. Shatner's bluster as Captain Kirk "is part of his charm. It's exactly what makes James Kirk so fun". Library Journal reviewed Avenger, stating "Shatner's team has created a compelling and satisfying morality play with a wiser Kirk and more emotional Spock". Library Journal also reviewed the audiobook edition of Spectre, saying: "Shatner does his usual adequate job, offering a melodious reading with a hint of apathy".

L.D. Meagher, writing for CNN, said Dark Victory was not easy for the casual fan to read as it wasn't intended to be a standalone novel and reader's needed to be familiar with the series. However, he thought fans of the series would be pleased with it.

Publishers Weekly reviewed the audiobook edition of Captain's Glory, writing: "Shatner ably embodies the voice of Kirk, but his characterizations of Picard, Riker, Worf and several others are mediocre and pale in comparison to the actors who created them".

== Related novels ==
=== The Ashes of Eden graphic novel ===
Star Trek: The Ashes of Eden is a 100-page, square-bound, graphic novel by Steve Erwin and Jimmy Palmiotti. Unlike the prose novel, Judith and Garfield Reeves-Stevens were credited as co-writers. No other Star Trek tie-in novel has been adapted as a graphic novel. Published by DC Comics.

Title	Author(s)	Date	ISBN
Star Trek: The Ashes of Eden	William Shatner, with Judith and Garfield Reeves-Stevens	May 18. 1995	1-56389-235-9

=== Millennium (2000) ===
Star Trek: Deep Space Nine – Millennium miniseries explores an alternate-timeline accidentally created by the crew of the Defiant. The series was partially adapted as The Fallen (2000), a third-person shooter video game developed by The Collective. An omnibus edition was published in 2002. The miniseries is not directly linked to the Odyssey or Mirror Universe trilogies, however the novels include references to Spectre (1998) and its sequels.

No.	Title	Author(s)	Date	ISBN
1	The Fall of Terok Nor	Judith and Garfield Reeves-Stevens	March 2000	0-671-02401-9
2	The War of the Prophets	Judith and Garfield Reeves-Stevens	March 2000	0-671-02402-7
3	Inferno	Judith and Garfield Reeves-Stevens	April 2000	0-671-02403-5

=== Collision Course (2007) ===
Star Trek: Academy is a flagship novel series featuring a young Midshipman Jim Kirk. The only published novel, Collision Course, ties into The Ashes of Eden (1995). The premise began as a television series pitch presented to UPN in 2003, the network which aired Star Trek: Voyager and Enterprise. In 2007, Shatner and the Reeves-Stevenses rewrote the proposed pilot episode as Collision Course. In a 2022 retrospective, Screen Rant noted setting Collision Course at Starfleet Academy was a good choice, but the novel faltered in its execution. A sequel, Trial Run, was announced in 2007 but was never published.

A new novel, Third Class, appeared in electronic bookseller catalogs during the spring and summer of 2019 but no official release date was listed. The title was later withdrawn without explanation.

Title	Author(s)	Date	ISBN
Collision Course	William Shatner, with Judith and Garfield Reeves-Stevens	October 16, 2007	978-1-4165-0397-2
Trial Run	Judith and Garfield Reeves-Stevens	2008–2009	(unpublished)
Third Class	Judith and Garfield Reeves-Stevens	2019–2020	(unpublished)

=== Forged in Fire (2007) ===
Star Trek: Excelsior – Forged in Fire was the only novel of a planned flagship series set aboard the Excelsior (NCC-2000) under the command of Hikaru Sulu. The novel includes references to The Ashes of Eden (1995) and Collision Course (2007).

Title	Author(s)	Date	ISBN
Forged in Fire	Michael A. Martin and Andy Mangels	December 26, 2007	978-1-4165-4716-7

== See also ==
- List of Star Trek novels
