= Race to Mars =

2007 Canadian TV mini-series

- Written by: Garfield Reeves-Stevens; Judith Reeves-Stevens
- Directed by: George Mihalka
- Starring: Michael Riley; Lothaire Bluteau; Pascale Bussières
- Narrated by: William Shatner
- Country of origin: Canada
- Original language: English
- No. of episodes: 2

Production
- Executive producers: Arnie Gelbart; Ken MacDonald; Phyllis Platt
- Producer: Pia Marquard

Original release
- Network: Discovery Channel Canada
- Release: September 23 – September 30, 2007

Race to Mars is a 2007 Canadian television mini-series about a fictitious mission to Mars that is based on contemporary international research. The first part aired on Discovery Channel Canada and its High Definition channel on September 23, 2007 and the second part on September 30. It was produced in association with Galafilm Inc. William Shatner narrates the miniseries.

A companion book of the same title, written by Dana Berry, was also published in September 2007. It was offered as a selection of the Science Fiction Book Club.

Mars Rising, a companion 6-episode documentary mini-series, aired from October 7 to October 21, 2007, using sequences shot for Race to Mars.

== Plot ==
The four-hour mini-series begins in the year 2026, with a test lander exploding on landing. Jumping to 2029, the narrator explains the mission, 'Project Olympus' and shows the four NTR spacecraft: Cargo lander Shirase, Mars Surface Habitat Atlantis, Mars lander Gagarin, and Crew Transfer Vehicle Terra Nova. In early 2030, the international crew of six astronauts from the United States, Russia, France, Canada and Japan board Terra Nova to begin their 582 day journey to Mars and back. They suffer numerous equipment failures along the way, eventually traced back to fraud on the part of a subcontractor. The international team is racing against China, who have already landed a robot on Mars. The astronauts land on Mars, but astrobiologist Hiromi's arm is broken by a faulty landing gear. Later, the Chinese robot finds water, but it contains too much calcium chloride for it to contain life. The crew's drilling equipment is irreparably damaged by a Martian dust devil. The crew sends an impassioned plea back to Earth, asking to allow them to cannibalize the Chinese robot lander, saying that the exploration of Mars should be for humankind and not be limited by politics.

The crew's proposal is accepted, and they redouble their drilling efforts. After days of non-stop work, they finally strike water, but crew member Hiromi is killed when pressure builds in the well causing an explosion that knocks over a beam of the drilling platform and crushes his spacesuit. After they ascend to the main spacecraft for the journey home, the entire crew becomes gravely ill. They suspect infection by Martian microbes, but commander Rick Erwin refuses to open the seals on their Martian samples for fear of further contamination. It is discovered that carbon monoxide poisoning is the actual culprit, and they manage to deal with the problem. On final approach to Earth it is discovered that the Terra Nova's braking thrusters are malfunctioning making a safe return impossible unless repairs are carried out. After a dangerous spacewalk they repair the damage but astronaut Antoine Hebert is nearly killed by electrocution. The mini-series ends as Olympus' crew module prepares to land and then cuts to a scene in the year 2095 to show a Mars base named for Robert H. Goddard, situated near Hiromi's grave site.

== See also ==
- List of films set on Mars
