= Prime Directive (novel) =

1990 novel by Judith and Garfield Reeves Stevens

- First edition
- Authors: Judith Reeves-Stevens, Garfield Reeves-Stevens
- Cover artist: Myles Sprinzen
- Language: English
- Series: Pocket TOS
- Genre: Science fiction
- Publisher: Pocket Books
- Publication date: 1 September 1990 (1st Hardcover edition)
- Publication place: United States
- Media type: Print (Hardcover)
- Pages: 406 pp (Hardcover 1st edition)
- ISBN: 0-671-70772-8 (Hardcover 1st edition)
- OCLC: 23650478
- Dewey Decimal: 813/.54 20
- LC Class: PR9199.3.R428 S7 1990

Prime Directive is a 1990 novel written by Judith and Garfield Reeves Stevens.

== Plot summary ==
On a local moon of Talin IV, a Federation first contact observation post is monitoring the events on the planet below with growing confusion and concern. Talin IV, a world inhabited by a reptilian society with a culture equivalent to late-20th century Earth, and possible first contact prospect for the Federation in the near future, is now a world divided. The two principal nation states of the planet have become increasingly paranoid and in danger of instigating a nuclear war. Provocations seem to be coming from each side, although both sides deny any intrusions into enemy space. Each nation's heightened security has made the UFP First Contact Office's work much harder, as detection has become more likely. Further complicating matters, Talin scientists have been researching naturally occurring dilithium crystals that may be capable of sensing the advanced subspace signals used by the galactic community. While the discovery of an interplanetary culture would allow for contact with the Federation, it is also possible the Talin will destroy themselves before they make that historic leap. To avoid accidentally revealing their presence and possibly affecting the delicate political situation, the Talin system is locked down by the First Contact Office, so no use of subspace or warp drive is permitted near the planet.

While preparing for their mission, James T. Kirk, Mr. Spock and Dr. McCoy discuss the similar situation that faced Earth. To determine whether or not the First Contact Office has been discovered, Kirk and a joint USS Enterprise/First Contact Office team beam down to the planet at one point, narrowly escaping detection. Soon after, Kirk prevents an accidental nuclear detonation from erupting into full-scale nuclear war. Afterward, Kirk convenes a board of inquiry on his own actions, and it is determined that he acted to prevent what was most likely a computer error from destroying a world. However, shortly after the inquiry, all the planet's nuclear arsenals are fired at their targets at once. The Enterprise is crippled when an intercontinental ballistic missile warhead explodes nearby. The fact that the missile targets the Enterprise is seemingly conclusive proof that Kirk's actions have not only revealed the existence of his ship, but that his prior intervention has also prevented the Talin culture from learning the lessons needed to prevent nuclear self-destruction.

Kirk and the other senior officers (with the exception of Scotty, who was not on the bridge at the time) are blamed for the destruction of Talin civilization, attributed to their supposed violation of Starfleet's Prime Directive (hence the title of the book), and either resign from Starfleet, are demoted to ensign, or in Uhura's case, court-martialed and dishonorably discharged. Although they are separated, Kirk's crew do not give up individual efforts to return and establish what went wrong at Talin. Kirk, under assumed aliases, works his way across space as laborer and cargo chief. Sulu and Chekov join up with an Orion smuggler and slave trader in order to steal his ship. Uhura and McCoy join forces and purchase a space craft and create a fictitious identity for McCoy, the feared pirate "Black Ire." On Earth, Spock joins forces with a radical student group that advocates the elimination of the Prime Directive. Through manipulation of the students, the Vulcan embassy and the by-laws of the Federation, Spock arranges for two Talin astronauts (one from each of the two Talin superpowers) who escaped before the planet's destruction, to speak before the Federation Council as ambassadors for their planet, and request the Federation's help. Through various means, Spock, Kirk and the other senior Enterprise officers rendezvous with Scotty (who has been working feverishly to refurbish the nearly-destroyed Enterprise) at the now-closed observation post on Talin's moon.

It is revealed that the nations of Talin IV were manipulated into attacking each other by insect-like drones of a planet-sized creature called the "One," which is slowly approaching Talin IV. The drones (called the "Many") were sent to prepare Talin IV for consumption by the One. The drones fomented the nuclear exchange as part of their efforts to create conditions on the planets' surface conducive to the growth of the algae that is the One's food. Ultimately, a gas giant planet in the Talin system is substituted for Talin IV as the One's new food source, sparing Talin IV without destroying the One. Kirk and the other senior officers are restored to full rank and resume their duty stations on the Enterprise. Kirk lands on the surface of the planet with an away team, which begins reviving billions of Talin who have survived by going into hibernation.

== Reception ==
Ann-Marie Cahill of BookRiot.com recommend the book as "one of my absolute favourites" and praises the book for the ways it addresses ethical challenges through the different perspectives of characters from the original series. Publishers Weekly wrote: "The intricate Star Trek universe is handled well, especially in an amusing subplot putting Sulu and Chekov aboard an Orion pirate ship. While this installment is unlikely to attract new readers to the series, Trekkies will not be disappointed."

The novel is a favorite of the relaunch film's co-writer Roberto Orci.
