= Airships (Bastion Press) =

2002 role-playing game supplement

Airships is a 2002 role-playing game supplement for d20 System published by Bastion Press.

== Contents ==
Airships is a supplement in which a comprehensive supplement delivers full rules for building, crewing, navigating, and battling with fantastical flying vessels—complete with engines, classes, spells, items, deck plans, and skyborne hazards.

== Reviews ==
- Pyramid
- Fictional Reality (Issue 12 - Jun 2003)
- Legions Realm Monthly (Issue 10 - Jun 2003)
- Valkyrie (Issue 27 - 2003)
