= Gordon R. Dickson bibliography =

The complete bibliography of Gordon R. Dickson.

== Collections and anthologies ==
=== 1950s ===
- 1957 Earthman's Burden, with Poul Anderson (Gnome, hc, collection)
  - ""The Sheriff of Canyon Gulch", aka "Heroes Are Made" (1951, ss)
  - "Don Jones" (original nv)
  - "In Hoka Signo Vinces" (1953, ss)
  - "The Adventure of the Misplaced Hound" (1953, nv)
  - "Yo Ho Hoka!" (1955, nv)
  - "The Tiddlywink Warriors" (1955, nv)

=== 1960s ===
- 1963 Rod Serling's Triple W: Witches, Warlocks and Werewolves, ghost-edited by Dickson (Bantam, pb, collection)
  - "The Amulet" (1959, ss)
- 1967 Rod Serling's Devils and Demons, ghost-edited by Dickson (Bantam, pb, collection)

=== 1970s ===
- 1970 Danger—Human (Doubleday, hc, collection)
  - "Danger - Human!" (1957, ss)
  - "Dolphin's Way" (1964, ss)
  - "And Then There Was Peace" (1962, ss)
  - "The Man from Earth (short story)|The Man from Earth" (1964, ss)
  - "Black Charlie" (1954, ss)
  - "Zeepsday" (1956, ss)
  - "Lulungomeena" (1954, ss)
  - "An Honorable Death" (1961, ss)
  - "Flat Tiger" (1956, ss)
  - "James" (1955, ss)
  - "The Quarry" (1958, ss)
  - "Call Him Lord" (1966, ss)
  - "Steel Brother" (1952, nv)
- 1970 Mutants (Macmillan, hc, collection)
  - "Warrior" (1965, nv)
  - "Of the People" (1955, ss)
  - "Danger - Human!" (1957, ss)
  - "Rehabilitated" (1961, ss)
  - "Listen" (1952, ss)
  - "Roofs of Silver" (1962, nv)
  - "By New Hearth Fires" (1959, ss)
  - "Idiot Solvant" (1962, ss)
  - "The Immortal" (1965, nv)
  - "Miss Prinks" (1954, ss)
  - "Home from the Shore" (1963, nv)* 1973 The Book of Gordon Dickson, retitle of 1970s Danger—Human (DAW, pb, collection)
- 1973 The Star Road (Doubleday, hc, collection)
  - "Whatever Gods There Be" (1961, ss)
  - "Hilifter", aka "None But Man" (1963, ss)
  - "Building on the Line" (1968, nv)
  - "The Christmas Present" (1958, ss)
  - "Three-Part Puzzle" (1962, ss)
  - "On Messenger Mountain" (1964, na)
  - "The Catch" (1959, ss)
  - "Jackal's Meal" (1969, nv)
  - "The Mousetrap" (1952, ss)
- 1974 Ancient, My Enemy (Doubleday, hc, collection)
  - "Ancient, My Enemy" (1969, nv)
  - "The Odd Ones" (1955, ss)
  - "The Monkey Wrench" (1951, ss)
  - "Tiger Green" (1965, nv)
  - "The Friendly Man" (1951, ss)
  - "Love Me True" (1961, ss)
  - "Our First Death" (1955, nv)
  - "In the Bone (short story)|In the Bone", (1966, ss)
  - "The Bleak and Barren Land" (1953, nv)
- 1975 Combat SF, Gordon R. Dickson ed, (Doubleday, hc, anthology)
  - "Ricochet on Miza" (1952, ss)
- 1978 Gordon R. Dickson's SF Best, James R. Frenkel ed, (Dell, pb, collection)
  - "Hilifter" (1963, ss)
  - "Brother Charlie" (1958, nv)
  - "Act of Creation" (1957, ss)
  - "Idiot Solvant" (1962, ss)
  - "Call Him Lord" (1966, ss)
  - "Tiger Green" (1965, nv)
  - "Of the People" (1955, ss)
  - "Dolphin's Way" (1964, ss)
  - "In the Bone", (1966, ss)
- 1978 Nebula Winners Twelve, Gordon R. Dickson ed, (collection: Harper & Row, hc; Bantam, pb, 1979)
- 1979 The Spirit of Dorsai (Ace, pb, collection)
  - "Amanda Morgan" (original na)
  - "Brothers" (1973, na)

=== 1980s ===
- 1980 In Iron Years (collection: Doubleday, hc; Ace, pb, 1981)* 1980 In Iron Years (collection: Doubleday, hc; Ace, pb, 1981)
  - "In Iron Years" (nv)
  - "Homecoming" (ss)
  - "A Taste of Tenure" (nv)
  - "The Hours Are Good" (ss)
  - "Gifts" (ss)
  - "Zeepsday" (ss)
  - "Things Which Are Caesar's" (na)
- 1980 Lost Dorsai (Ace, tp, collection)
  - "Lost Dorsai" (revised na)
  - "Warrior" (nv)
  - "The Final Encyclopedia: An Excerpt"
- 1981 Love Not Human, (Ace, pb, collection)
  - "Black Charlie" (ss)
  - "Moon, June, Spoon, Croon" (ss)
  - "The Summer Visitors" (ss)
  - "Listen" (ss)
  - "Graveyard" (nv)
  - "Fido" (ss)
  - "The Breaking of Jerry McCloud" (ss)
  - "Love Me True" (ss)
  - "The Christmas Present" (ss)
  - "It Hardly Seems Fair" (ss)
  - "The Monster and the Maiden", aka "The Mortal and the Monster" (na)
- 1983 Hoka! with Poul Anderson (Wallaby, tp, collection)
  - "Joy in Mudville" (nv)
  - "Undiplomatic Immunity" (nv)
  - "Full Pack (Hokas Wild)" (nv)
  - "The Napoleon Crime" (nv)
- 1983 The Man from Earth (Tor, pb, collection)
  - "Call Him Lord" (ss)
  - "The Odd Ones" (ss)
  - "In the Bone" (ss)
  - "Danger—Human" (ss)
  - "Tiger Green" (nv)
  - "The Man from Earth" (ss)
  - "Ancient, My Enemy" (nv)
  - "The Bleak and Barren Land" (nv)
  - "Steel Brother" (nv)
  - "Love Me True" (ss)
- 1984 Survival! (Baen, pb, collection)
  - "After the Funeral", (ss)
  - "Breakthrough Gang", (ss)
  - "Button, Button", (ss)
  - "Carry Me Home", (nv)
  - "Friend for Life", (ss)
  - "The General and the Axe", (nv)
  - "Jean Dupres", (nv)
  - "No Shield from the Dead", (ss)
  - "Our First Death", (nv)
  - "The Question", (ss)
  - "Rescue", (ss)
  - "The Underground", (nv)
- 1984 Dickson! (NESFA Press, hc, collection, limited ed)
  - "Childe Cycle: Status 1984" (updated article)
  - "The Hard Way" (nv)
  - "The Law-Twister Shorty" (nv)
  - "Out of the Darkness" (ss)
  - "Perfectly Adjusted" (na)
  - "Steel Brother" (nv)
- 1985 Steel Brother, retitle of Dickson! plus one story (Tor, pb, collection)
  - "The Man in the Mailbag" (nv)
- 1985 Beyond the Dar Al-Harb (Tor, pb, collection)
  - "Beyond the Dar Al-Harb" (original na)
  - "On Messenger Mountain" (na)
  - "Things Which Are Caesar's" (na)
- 1985 Forward! Sandra Miesel ed (Baen, pb, collection)
  - "Babes in the Wood" (ss)
  - "Building on the Line" (nv)
  - "The Dreamsman" (ss)
  - "The Game of Five" (nv)
  - "Guided Tour" (verse)
  - "Napoleon's Skullcap" (nv)
  - "One on Trial" (ss)
  - "The Queer Critter" (ss)
  - "The R of A" (ss)
  - "Rescue Mission" (ss)
  - "Robots are Nice?" (ss)
  - "Twig" (nv)
- 1985 Invaders! (Baen, pb, collection)
  - "The Error of Their Ways" (ss)
  - "Fellow of the Bees" (nv)
  - "The Invaders" (na)
  - "Itco's Strong Right Arm" (nv)
  - "The Law-Twister Shorty" (nv)
  - "An Ounce of Emotion" (nv)
  - "Ricochet on Miza" (ss)
  - "Roofs of Silver" (nv)
- 1986 The Dorsai Companion, with commentary by Sandra Miesel (Ace, pb, collection)
  - "Amanda Morgan" (na)
  - "Brothers" (na)
  - "Lost Dorsai" (revised na)
  - "Warrior" (nv)
- 1986 The Last Dream, (Baen, pb, collection)
  - "The Amulet" (ss)
  - "A Case History" (ss)
  - "The Girl Who Played Wolf" (ss)
  - "The Haunted Village" (nv)
  - "The Last Dream" (ss)
  - "The Present State of Igneos Research" (article)
  - "Salmanazar" (ss)
  - "St. Dragon and the George" (nv)
  - "The Three" (ss)
  - "Walker Between the Planes" (na)
  - "With Butter and Mustard", (ss)
  - "Ye Prentice and Ye Dragon" (verse)
- 1986 The Man the Worlds Rejected, 7 story collection, Tor (pb)
  - In Iron Years, (nv)
  - Jackal's Meal, (nv)
  - The Man the Worlds Rejected, (nv)
  - A Matter of Perspective, (article)
  - Minotaur, (ss)
  - The Monster and the Maiden, (na)
  - Strictly Confidential, (ss)
  - Turnabout, (nv)
- 1986 Mindspan, collection of 12 stories, Baen (pb)
  - Ballad of the Shoshonu, (song)
  - Catch a Tartar, (nv)
  - The Faithful Wilf, (ss)
  - Fleegl of Fleegl, (ss)
  - A Matter of Technique, (ss)
  - Miss Prinks, (ss)
  - Operation P-Button, (vignette)
  - Rex and Mr. Rejilla, (ss)
  - Show Me the Way to Go Home, (ss)
  - Sleight of Wit, (nv)
  - Soupstone, (nv)
  - Who Dares a Bulbur Eat? (ss)
  - A Wobble in Wockii Futures, (nv)
- 1987 In the Bone: The Best Science Fiction of Gordon R. Dickson, 11 stories, Ace (pb)
- Expands 1978's Gordon R. Dickson's SF Best
  - Act of Creation, (ss)
  - Brother Charlie, (nv)
  - Call Him Lord, (ss)
  - Dolphin's Way, (ss)
  - God Bless Them, (nv)
  - Hilifter (aka None But Man), (ss)
  - Idiot Solvant, (ss)
  - In the Bone, (ss)
  - Of the People, (ss)
  - Tiger Green, (nv)
  - Twig, (nv)
- 1987 The Stranger, sf collection of 14 stories, Tor (pb)
  - And Then There Was Peace, (ss)
  - The Catch, (ss)
  - Cloak and Stagger, (nv)
  - E Gubling Dow, (ss)
  - The Friendly Man, (ss)
  - God Bless Them, (nv)
  - The Green Building, (ss)
  - IT, Out of Darkest Jungle, (play)
  - James, (ss)
  - MX Knows Best, (nv)
  - The Quarry, (ss)
  - The Stranger, (ss)
  - Tempus Non Fugit, (nv)
  - Three-Part Puzzle, (ss)
- 1988 Beginnings, collection of 10 stories, Baen (pb)
  - The Brown Man, (verse)
  - Cloak and Stagger, (nv)
  - Danger - Human!, (ss)
  - Idiot Solvant, (ss)
  - Listen, (ss)
  - On Messenger Mountain, (na)
  - Powerway Emergency, (ss)
  - Seats of Hell, (na)
  - Soldier, Ask Not, (na)
  - Strictly Confidential, (ss)
  - Three-Part Puzzle, (ss)
  - untitled verse from The Final Encyclopedia
- 1988 Ends, collection of 12 stories, Baen (pb)
  - Ancient, My Enemy, (nv)
  - And Then There Was Peace, (ss)
  - Armageddon, (verse)
  - By New Hearth Fires, (ss)
  - Call Him Lord, (ss)
  - Computers Don't Argue, (ss)
  - Enter a Pilgrim, (ss)
  - An Honorable Death, (ss)
  - Lost Dorsai, (na)
  - Last Voyage, (ss)
  - Minotaur, (ss)
  - A Outrance, (verse)
  - Turnabout, (nv)
  - Whatever Gods There Be, (ss)
- 1988 Guided Tour, 14 story collection, Tor (pb)
  - Counter-Irritant, (ss)
  - Flat Tiger, (ss)
  - Guided Tour, (verse)
  - Hilifter, (ss)
  - I've Been Trying to Tell You, (ss)
  - Last Voyage, (ss)
  - Lulungomeena, (ss)
  - The Monkey Wrench, (ss)
  - The Mousetrap, (ss)
  - An Ounce of Emotion, (nv)
  - The Rebels, (ss)
  - Rehabilitated, (ss)
  - The Star Fool, (ss)
  - Time Grabber, (ss)

=== 1990s ===
- 1991 The Harriers, anthology edited by Dickson, Baen (pb)
- 1993 Blood and War (The Harriers, Vol 2), anthology edited by Dickson, Baen (pb)
- 1998 Hoka! Hoka! Hoka!, exp of 1957's Earthman's Burden w Poul Anderson, Baen (pb)
  - The Adventure of the Misplaced Hound, (nv)
  - Don Jones, (nv)
  - In Hoka Signo Vinces, (ss)
  - Joy in Mudville, (nv)
  - The Sheriff of Canyon Gulch (aka Heroes Are Made), (ss)
  - The Tiddlywink Warriors, (nv)
  - Undiplomatic Immunity, (nv)
  - Yo Ho Hoka! (nv)

=== 2000s ===
- 2000 Hokas Pokas! (w Poul Anderson), collection/omnibus, Baen (pb)
  - Full Pack (Hokas Wild), (nv)
  - The Napoleon Crime, (nv)
  - Star Prince Charlie, (1975 novel)
- 2003 The Human Edge, 12 previously collected stories, H. Davis ed, Baen (pb)
  - Brother Charlie, (nv)
  - The Catch, (ss)
  - Danger—Human, (ss)
  - The Game of Five, (nv)
  - The Hard Way, (nv)
  - In the Bone, (ss)
  - Jackal's Meal, (nv)
  - On Messenger Mountain, (na)
  - An Ounce of Emotion, (nv)
  - Sleight of Wit, (nv)
  - Three-Part Puzzle, (ss)
  - Tiger Green, (nv)

== Novels ==
=== 1950s ===
- 1956 Alien From Arcturus, sf novel, Ace D-139
- 1956 Mankind on the Run, sf novel, Ace D-164 db
- 1959 Dorsai!, sf novel, Astounding: May, June and July

=== 1960s ===
- 1960 The Genetic General, abridged retitle of Dorsai!, sf novel, Ace D-449
- 1960 Secret Under the Sea, young-adult sf novel, Henry Holt
- 1960 Time to Teleport, sf novel, Ace D-449
- 1961 Delusion World, sf novel, Ace F-119
- 1961 Naked to the Stars, sf novel, The Magazine of Fantasy & Science Fiction: October and November; Pyramid (paperback)
- 1961 Spacial Delivery, sf novel, Ace F-119
- 1962 Necromancer, sf novel, Doubleday
- 1963 No Room For Man, retitle of Necromancer, Macfadden
- 1963 Secret Under Antarctica, young-adult sf novel, Holt, Rinehart & Winston
- 1964 Secret Under the Caribbean, young-adult sf novel, Holt, Rinehart & Winston
- 1965 The Alien Way, sf novel, Bantam
- 1965 Mission to Universe, sf novel, Berkley
- 1965 Space Winners, young-adult sf novel, Holt, Rinehart & Winston
- 1967 Planet Run (with Keith Laumer), sf novel, Doubleday
- 1967 Soldier, Ask Not, sf novel, Dell
- 1967 The Space Swimmers, sf novel, Berkley
- 1969 None But Man, sf novel, Doubleday (DAW 266)
- 1969 Spacepaw, sf novel, Ace
- 1969 Wolfling, sf novel, Analog: January, February and March; Dell (paperback)

=== 1970s ===
- 1970 The Hour of the Horde, sf novel, Putnam
- 1970 Tactics of Mistake, sf novel, Analog: October, November and December 1970 / January 1971 (Doubleday, 1971)
- 1971 The Outposter, sf novel, Analog: May, June, and July (Lippincott 1972)
- 1971 Sleepwalker's World, sf novel, Lippincott
- 1972 The Pritcher Mass, sf novel, Analog: August, September and October (Doubleday)
- 1973 Alien Art, sf novel, Dutton
- 1973 The Far Call, sf novel, Analog: August, September and October (Dial Press 1978)
- 1973 The R-Master, sf novel, Lippincott (DAW 137)
- 1974 Gremlins, Go Home!, young-adult sf novel (with Ben Bova), St. Martin's
- 1975 Lifeboat (with Harry Harrison), sf novel, Analog: February, March and April
- 1975 Star Prince Charlie (with Poul Anderson), young-adult sf novel, Putnam
- 1975 Three to Dorsai!, 3 novel omnibus, Doubleday (hardcover)
  - Dorsai!, 1959 novel
  - Necromancer, 1962 novel
  - Tactics of Mistake, 1970 novel
- 1976 The Dragon and the George, fantasy novel, SF Book Club British Fantasy Award
- 1976 The Lifeship, (retitle of Lifeboat), sf novel, Harper & Row
- 1977 Time-Storm, sf novel, St. Martin's
- 1978 Home From the Shore, sf novel, Ace
- 1978 Pro, sf novel, Ace
- 1979 Arcturus Landing (revision of 1956's Alien From Arcturus), Ace
- 1979 Masters of Everon, sf novel, SF Book Club

=== 1980s ===
- 1984 The Final Encyclopedia, sf novel, Ace (paperback) and Tor (hardcover)
- 1984 Jamie the Red (with Roland Green), sword & sorcery fantasy novel, Ace (paperback)
- 1984 The Last Master, rewrite of 1973's The R-Master, Tor (paperback)
- 1985 Secrets of the Deep, omnibus of three young-adult sf novels, Critic's Choice Paperbacks (paperback)
  - Secret Under the Sea, 1960 novel
  - Secret Under Antarctica, 1963 novel
  - Secret Under the Caribbean, 1964 novel
- 1986 The Forever Man, sf novel, Ace
- 1986 On the Run, retitle of 1956's Mankind on the Run, Tor (paperback)
- 1987 Way of the Pilgrim, sf novel, Ace (hardcover and paperback)
- 1988 The Chantry Guild, sf novel, Ace (hardcover and paperback)
- 1989 The Earth Lords, fantasy novel, Ace (paperback) (Sphere UK)

=== 1990s ===
- 1990 The Dragon Knight, fantasy novel, Tor (hardcover)
- 1990 Wolf and Iron, sf novel, Easton and Tor (hardcover)
- 1991 Naked to the Stars/The Alien Way, two sf novel omnibus, Tor double (paperback)
  - Naked to the Stars, 1961 novel
  - The Alien Way, 1965 novel
- 1991 Young Bleys, sf novel, Tor (hardcover and paperback)
- 1992 The Dragon on the Border, fantasy novel, Ace (hardcover and paperback)
- 1992 The Dragon at War, fantasy novel, Ace (hardcover and paperback) and SF Book Club
- 1994 The Dragon, the Earl, and the Troll, fantasy novel, Ace (hardcover)
- 1994 Other, sf novel, Tor (hardcover and paperback)
- 1995 The Magnificent Wilf, sf novel, Baen
- 1996 The Dragon and the Djinn, fantasy novel, Ace (hardcover and paperback)
- 1997 The Dragon and the Gnarly King, fantasy novel, Tor (hardcover)
- 1997 The Final Encyclopedia: Vol 2, Tor / Orb
- 1998 The Dragon in Lyonesse, fantasy novel, Tor Books (hardcover)

=== 2000s ===
- 2000 The Right to Arm Bears, collection of two sf novels and one novelette, Baen
- 2001 The Dragon and the Fair Maid of Kent, fantasy novel, Tor and SF Book Club (hardcover)
- 2002 Dorsai Spirit, novel and collection omnibus, Tor (hardcover)
  - Dorsai! [also known as The Genetic General], (1960 novel)
  - The Spirit of Dorsai, (1979 collection)
- 2002 Four to Dorsai!, 4 novel omnibus, SF Book Club (hardcover) #14301
  - Dorsai! (1959 novel)
  - Necromancer, (1962 novel)
  - Soldier, Ask Not, (1964 novel)
  - Tactics of Mistake, (1970 novel)
- 2002 Hour of the Gremlins, three novel omnibus, Baen
  - Gremlins Go Home, (1974 novel, with Ben Bova)
  - The Hour of the Horde, (1970 novel)
  - Wolfling, (1969 novel)

== Short stories ==
=== A ===
- Across the River, (ss), Asimov's SF: Summer 1977
- Act of Creation, (ss), Satellite, April 1957
- The Adventure of the Misplaced Hound (w Poul Anderson), (nv), Universe, Dec 1953
- After the Funeral, (ss), Fantastic: April 1959
- Amanda Morgan, (na), The Spirit of Dorsai, Ace, 1979
- The Amulet, (ss), F&SF: April 1959
- Ancient, My Enemy, (nv), IF: Dec 1969
- And Then There Was Peace, (ss), IF: Sept, 1962
- Armageddon, (verse), The Final Encyclopedia, Tor, 1984

=== B ===
- Babes in the Wood, (ss), Other Worlds, May 1953
- Ballad of the Shoshonu, (song), Sixth Year's Best SF, J. Merril ed, Dell, June 1961
- Battle Hymn of the Friendly Soldiers, (verse), Galaxy: Oct 1964
- Beyond the Dar al-Harb, (na), Beyond the Dar Al-Harb, Tor, 1985
- Black Charlie, (ss), Galaxy: April 1954
- The Bleak and Barren Land, (nv), Space Stories, Feb 1953
- The Breaking of Jerry McCloud, (ss), Universe, Sept 1953
- Breakthrough Gang, (ss), F&SF: Dec 1965
- Brother Charlie, (nv), F&SF: July 1958
- Brothers, (na), Astounding: H. Harrison ed, Random, 1973
- The Brown Man, (verse), The Final Encyclopedia, Tor, 1984
- Building on the Line, (nv), Galaxy: Nov 1968
- Button, Button, (ss), F&SF: Sept 1960
- By New Hearth Fires, (ss), Astounding: Jan 1959

=== C ===
- Call Him Lord, (ss), Analog: May 1966 Nebula Award
- Carry Me Home, (nv), IF: Nov 1954
- A Case History, (ss), F&SF: Dec 1954
- The Catch, (ss), Astounding: April 1959
- Catch a Tartar, (nv), Worlds of Tomorrow: Sept 1965
- The Christmas Present, (ss), F&SF: Jan 1958
- Cloak and Stagger, (nv), Future: Fall 1957
- The Cloak and the Staff, (nv), Analog: Aug 1980 Hugo Award
- Computers Don't Argue, (ss), Analog: Sept 1965
- Counter-Irritant, (ss), Future: Nov 1953

=== D ===
- Danger! Human!, (ss), Astounding Dec 1957
- Dolphin's Way, (ss), Analog: June 1964
- Don Jones (w Poul Anderson), (nv), Earthman's Burden, Gnome, 1957
- The Dreamsman, (ss), Star SF #6, F. Pohl ed, Ballantine, 1959

=== E ===
- E Gubling Dow, (ss), Satellite, May 1959
- Enter a Pilgrim, (ss), Analog: Aug 1974
- The Error of Their Ways, (ss), Astounding: July 1951

=== F ===
- The Faithful Wilf, (ss), Galaxy: June 1963
- Fellow of the Bees, (nv), Orbit #3, 1954
- Fido, (ss), F&SF: Nov 1957
- Flat Tiger, (ss), Galaxy: Mar 1956
- Fleegl of Fleegl, (ss), Venture, May 1958
- Friend for Life, (ss), Venture, Mar 1957
- The Friendly Man, (ss), Astounding: Feb 1951
- Full Pack {Hokas Wild} (w Poul Anderson), (nv), F&SF: Oct 1957

=== G ===
- The Game of Five, (nv), F&SF: Sept 1957 (& April 1960)
- The General and the Axe, (nv), Infinity: Nov 1957
- Gifts, (ss), Astounding: Nov 1958
- The Girl Who Played Wolf, (ss), Fantastic: Aug 1958
- God Bless Them, (nv), The Best of Omni SF No. 3, B. Bova & D, Myrus eds, Omni, 1982
- Graveyard, (nv), Future: July 1953
- The Green Building, (ss), Satellite, Dec 1956
- Guided Tour, (verse), F&SF: Oct 1959

=== H ===
- The Hard Way, (nv), Analog: Jan 1963
- The Haunted Village, (nv), F&SF: Aug 1961
- Heroes Are Made (w Poul Anderson)(aka The Sheriff of Canyon Gulch), (ss), Other Worlds, May 1951
- Hilifter, (ss), Analog: Feb 1963
- Home from the Shore, (nv), Galaxy: Feb 1963
- Homecoming, (ss), IF: Sept 1959
- An Honorable Death, (ss), Galaxy: Feb 1961
- The Hours Are Good, (ss), Galaxy: Oct 1960
- House of Weapons, (na), Far Frontiers Vol. II, J. Pournelle & J. Baen eds, Baen, 1985

=== I ===
- Idiot Solvant, (ss), Analog: Jan 1962
- The Immortal, (nv), F&SF: Aug 1965
- In Hoka Signo Vinces (w Poul Anderson), (ss), Other Worlds, June 1953
- In Iron Years, (nv), F&SF: Oct 1974
- In the Bone, (ss), IF: Oct 1966
- The Invaders, (na), Space Stories, Oct 1952
- It Hardly Seems Fair, (ss), Amazing: April 1960
- IT, Out of Darkest Jungle, (play), Fantastic: Dec 1964
- Itco's Strong Right Arm, (nv), Cosmos SF&F, July 1954
- I've Been Trying to Tell You, (ss), Fantastic Universe: Nov 1959

=== J ===
- Jackal's Meal, (nv), Analog: June 1969
- James, (ss), F&SF: May 1955
- Jean Dupres, (nv), Nova 1, H. Harrison ed, Delacorte, 1970
- Joy in Mudville (w Poul Anderson), (nv), F&SF: Nov 1955

=== K ===
- None.

=== L ===
- The Last Dream, (ss), F&SF: July 1960
- Last Voyage, (ss), Science Fiction Stories, July 1958
- The Law-Twister Shorty, (nv), The Many Worlds of Science Fiction, B. Bova ed, Dutton, 1971
- Listen, (ss), F&SF: Aug 1952
- Lost Dorsai, (na), Destinies, Feb 1980 Hugo Award
- Love Me True, (ss), Analog: Oct 1961
- Love Song, (?), The Last Dangerous Visions, H. Ellison ed, (hasn't appeared as yet)
- Lulungomeena, (ss), Galaxy: Jan 1954

=== M ===
- The Man from Earth, (ss), Galaxy: June 1964
- The Man in the Mailbag, (nv), Galaxy: April 1959
- The Man the Worlds Rejected, (nv), Planet Stories: July 1953
- A Matter of Technique, (ss), F&SF: May 1958
- Maverick (aka Walker Between the Planes), (na), Worlds of Fantasy #2, 1970
- Minotaur, (ss), IF: Mar 1961
- Miss Prinks, (ss), F&SF: June 1954
- The Monkey Wrench, (ss), Astounding: Aug 1951
- The Monster and the Maiden (aka The Mortal and the Monster), (na), Stellar Short Novels, J-L del Rey ed, Ballantine, 1976
- Moon, June, Spoon, Croon, (ss), Startling Stories: Summer 1955
- The Mortal and the Monster (aka The Monster and the Maiden), (na), Stellar Short Novels, J-L del Rey ed, Ballantine, 1976
- The Mousetrap, (ss), Galaxy: Sept 1952
- MX Knows Best, (nv), Saturn, July 1957
- The Napoleon Crime (w Poul Anderson), (nv), Analog: Mar 1983

=== N ===
- Napoleon's Skullcap, (nv), F&SF: May 1962
- No Shield from the Dead, (ss), IF: Jan 1953

=== O ===
- The Odd Ones, (ss), IF: Feb, 1955
- Of the People, (ss), F&SF: Dec 1955
- Of War and Codes and Honor (w Chelsea Quinn Yarbro), (na), The Harriers, Baen, 1991
- On Messenger Mountain, (na), Worlds of Tomorrow: June 1964
- One on Trial, (ss), F&SF: May 1960
- Operation P-Button, (vignette), Infinity: R. Hoskins ed, Lancer, 1970
- An Ounce of Emotion, (nv), IF: Oct 1965
- Our First Death, (nv), F&SF: Aug 1955
- Out of the Darkness, (ss), Ellery Queen, Feb 1961
- A Outrance, (verse), The Final Encyclopedia, Tor, 1984

=== P ===
- Perfectly Adjusted, (na), Science Fiction Stories, July 1955
- Powerway Emergency, (ss), Northern States Power Company, 1972
- Pro, (nv), Analog: Sept 1975

=== Q ===
- The Quarry, (ss), Astounding: Sept 1958
- The Queer Critter, (ss), Orbit #5, 1954
- The Question, (ss), Astounding: May 1958

=== R ===
- The R of A, (ss), F&SF: Jan 1959
- The Rebels, (ss), Fantastic Story Magazine: Winter 1954
- Rehabilitated, (ss), F&SF: Jan 1961
- Rescue, (ss), Future: June 1954
- Rescue Mission, (ss), F&SF: Jan 1957
- Rex and Mr. Rejilla, (ss), Galaxy: Jan 1958
- Ricochet on Miza, (ss), Planet Stories: Mar 1952
- Robots are Nice? (ss), Galaxy: Oct 1957
- Roofs of Silver, (nv), F&SF: Dec 1962

=== S ===
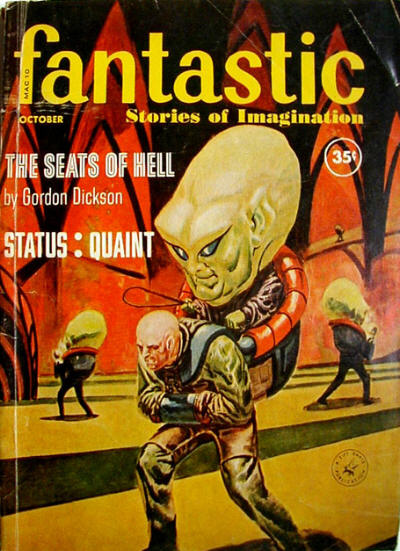
Dickson's novelette "The Seats of Hell", cover-featured on the May 1959 issue of Fantastic, was collected in Beginnings

- St. Dragon and the George, (nv), F&SF: Sept 1957
- Salmanazar, (ss), F&SF: Aug 1962
- Seats of Hell, (na), Fantastic: Oct 1960
- See Now, a Pilgrim, (na), Analog: Sept 1985
- The Sheriff of Canyon Gulch (w Poul Anderson) (aka Heroes Are Made), (ss), Other Worlds, May 1951
- Show Me the Way to Go Home, (ss), Startling Stories: Dec 1952
- Sleight of Wit, (nv), Analog: Dec 1961
- Soldier, Ask Not, (na), Galaxy: Oct 1964 Hugo Award
- Soupstone, (nv), Analog: July 1965
- St. Dragon and the George, (nv), F&SF: Sept 1957
- The Star Fool, (ss), Planet Stories: Sept 1951
- Steel Brother, (nv), Astounding: Feb 1952
- The Stranger, (ss), Imagination: May 1952
- Strictly Confidential, (ss), Fantastic Universe: Dec 1956
- The Summer Visitors, (ss), Fantastic: April 1960

=== T ===
- A Taste of Tenure, (nv), IF: July 1961
- Tempus Non Fugit, (nv), Science Fiction Stories, Mar 1957
- Thank you, Beep...! (ss), The Hewlett-Packard Personal Calculator Digest, Volume #5, 1979
- Things Which Are Caesar's, (na), The Day the Sun Stood Still, R. Silverberg ed, T. Nelson, 1972
- The Three, (ss), Startling Stories: May 1953
- Three-Part Puzzle, (ss), Analog: June 1962
- The Tiddlywink Warriors (w Poul Anderson), (nv), F&SF: Aug 1955
- Tiger Green, (nv), IF: Nov 1965
- Time Grabber, (ss), Imagination: Dec 1952
- Time Storm, (?), Asimov's SF: Spring 1977
- Trespass! (w Poul Anderson), (ss), Fantastic Story Quarterly, Spring 1950
- Turnabout, (nv), IF: Jan 1955
- Twig, (nv), Stellar #1, Judy-Lynn del Rey ed, Ballantine, 1974
- The Underground, (nv), Imagination: Dec 1955

=== U ===
- Undiplomatic Immunity (w Poul Anderson), (nv), F&SF: May 1957

=== V ===
- None.

=== W ===
- Walker Between the Planes (aka Maverick), (na), Worlds of Fantasy #2, 1970
- Warrior, (nv), Analog: Dec 1965
- Whatever Gods There Be, (ss), Amazing: July 1961
- Who Dares a Bulbur Eat? (ss), Galaxy: Oct 1962
- With Butter and Mustard, (ss), F&SF: Dec 1957
- A Wobble in Wockii Futures, (nv), Galaxy: April 1965

=== X ===
- None.

=== Y ===
- Ye Prentice and Ye Dragon, (verse), Analog: Jan 1975
- Yo Ho Hoka! (w Poul Anderson), (nv), F&SF: Mar 1955

=== Z ===
- Zeepsday, (ss), F&SF: Nov 1956

== Resources ==
- Thompson, Raymond H. (1983). Gordon R. Dickson: A Primary and Secondary Bibliography. G. K. Hall. ISBN 9780816183630.
- Sandercombe, W. Fraser (2010). "Gordon R. Dickson". Masters of SF : the Science Fiction Hall of Fame. Canada: Collector's Guide Publishing, Inc. p. 197-200. ISBN 978-1897350287.
- Phyllis Eisenstein; May Kay Kare; John M. Ford; Ben Bova; Joel Rosenberg; Dave Wixon (April 2001). "Remembering Gordy Dickson". Minicon 36 Program Book. Minnesota, USA: Rune Press. pp. 54–69.
- GORDON R. DICKSON - SF & Fantasy Bibliography
- Index to Science Fiction Anthologies and Collections
