= 1981 in science fiction =

The year 1981 was marked, in science fiction, by the following:

== Events ==
- The Kurd Laßwitz Award, for German-language science fiction, is established
- The 39th annual Worldcon, Denvention Two, was held in Denver, USA

== Births and deaths ==
=== Deaths ===
- Harry Bates

== Literary releases ==
=== Novels ===
- Downbelow Station, by C. J. Cherryh
- God-Emperor of Dune, by Frank Herbert
- VALIS, by Philip K. Dick

=== Short stories ===
- "Johnny Mnemonic" by William Gibson

== Anthologies ==
- The Golden Age of Science Fiction, ed. by Kingsley Amis

== Other books ==
- After Man, by Dougal Dixon

=== Comics ===
- First issue of Nexus, by Mike Baron and Steve Rude
- The first Rogue Trooper story, by Gerry Finley-Day and Dave Gibbons, is published in 2000 AD

== Movies ==
- Escape from New York, dir. by John Carpenter
- Heavy Metal, dir. by Gerald Potterton
- Mad Max 2/The Road Warrior, dir. by George Miller
- Scanners, dir. by David Cronenberg

== Video games ==
- Defender
- Zaxxon

== Awards ==
=== Hugos ===
- Best novel: The Snow Queen, by Joan D. Vinge
- Best novella: Lost Dorsai, by Gordon R. Dickson
- Best novelette: "The Cloak and the Staff", by Gordon R. Dickson
- Best short story: "Grotto of the Dancing Deer", by Clifford D. Simak
- Best related work: Cosmos, by Carl Sagan
- Best dramatic presentation: The Empire Strikes Back, dir. by Irvin Kershner; screenplay by Leigh Brackett and Lawrence Kasdan; story by George Lucas
- Best professional editor: Edward L. Ferman
- Best professional artist: Michael Whelan
- Best fanzine: Locus, ed. by Charles N. Brown
- Best fan writer: Susan Wood
- Best fan artist: Victoria Poyser

=== Nebulas ===
- Best novel: The Claw of the Conciliator, by Gene Wolfe
- Best novella: The Saturn Game, by Poul Anderson
- Best novelette: The Quickening, by Michael Bishop
- Best short story: The Bone Flute, by Lisa Tuttle

=== Other awards ===
- BSFA Award for Best Novel: The Shadow of the Torturer, by Gene Wolfe
- Locus Award for Best Science Fiction Novel: The Snow Queen, by Joan D. Vinge
- Saturn Award for Best Science Fiction Film: Superman II
