= Ends (short story collection) =

- Cover of the first edition
- Author: Gordon R. Dickson
- Cover artist: Carl Lundgren
- Language: English
- Genre: Science fiction
- Publisher: Baen Books
- Publication date: 1988
- Publication place: United States
- Media type: Print (paperback)
- Pages: 342
- ISBN: 0-671-69782-X
- OCLC: 18775637

Ends is a collection of science fiction stories and poems by American writer Gordon R. Dickson. It was first published by Baen Books in 1988 and as a companion volume to Dickson's Beginnings. The stories had originally appeared in the magazines Analog Science Fiction and Fact, Astounding, If, Galaxy Science Fiction, Destinies, Science Fiction Stories and Amazing Stories The poems first appeared in The Final Encyclopedia.

== Contents ==
- Foreword
- "A Outrance"
- "Computers Don’t Argue"
- "By New Hearth Fires"
- "Ancient, My Enemy"
- "Turnabout"
- "An Honorable Death"
- "Lost Dorsai"
- "Last Voyage"
- "Call Him Lord"
- "And Then There Was Peace"
- "Whatever Gods There Be"
- "Minotaur"
- "Enter a Pilgrim"
- "Armageddon"
