= The Science Fiction Radio Show =

Radio program about science fiction and fantasy genres

The Science Fiction Radio Show is an American radio show that aired between 1980 and 1983. It was syndicated nationally for the final two years..

The program broadcast interviews with science fiction and fantasy authors, filmmakers and others who worked in the genres.

== Origin ==
The Science Fiction Radio Show originated in 1979 from a proposed science fiction class at Odessa College in Odessa, Texas. David Carson, a media-design specialist at the college, and Keith Johnson, the school's astronomer and planetarium director, offered a science fiction course to students. However, it failed to attract enough interest.

Using material from the proposed course, Carson and Johnson created a radio show instead. Odessa College provided recording facilities and funds for tape and telephone expenses.

Daryl Lane (left) and David Carson (right) interview Jack Williamson

Daryl Lane, chair of the English Department at Odessa College; and David Crews, a production manager and digital musician, joined the team. Besides functioning as an interviewer and on-air voice, Crews also created the synthesized digital score that served as background music to the show.

== On the air ==
The first episode of The Science Fiction Radio Show aired on KOCV-FM in June 1980. For the first few months, the show consisted of thirty-minute presentations which aired Saturdays. Employing selections from author interviews, these shows focused on such staple science fiction themes as time travel or robots, or subgenres like Space Opera or New Wave.

The format was soon converted to a simple question-and-answer pattern. Besides discussing their individual books, authors revealed how they started their careers as science fiction writers and why they were drawn to particular themes. Sometimes the producers traveled to an author's home to tape him or her directly, sometimes they went to science fiction conventions and set up recording equipment in hotel rooms. Most often, the interviews were taped during telephone conversations.

Johnson and Crews soon left The Science Fiction Radio Show. In Spring 1981, William D. Vernon, a collector of science fiction paperbacks, became the producer.

== National syndication and format change ==
In 1981, Longhorn Radio Network in Austin, Texas agreed to syndicate The Science Fiction Radio Show. Longhorn switched the show from thirty-minutes once a week to a five-minute production airing every weekday. Before the syndication process was complete, the show's producers formed a corporation called The Permian Basin Science Fiction Association.

The Science Fiction Radio Show went off the air for the fall of 1981 while preparations were made for the new format. The producers also expanded their interview targets to encompass individuals peripheral to science fiction, people who were not authors but were somehow related to science fiction and fantasy. Included among the new class of interviewees were Roger Ebert; Jim Henson; agent Richard Curtis; Underwood Miller publishers Chuck Miller and Tim Underwood; Michael Whelan; and scientist Robert Forward.

In Spring 1982, The Science Fiction Radio Show returned to the air in syndication. The producers were Carson, Vernon, and Lane. Vernon and Lane conducted interviews and wrote the script for each show; Carson extracted selections from the raw interview tapes, spliced them into the recorded script, added theme music and segues, and mailed the finished product to Longhorn. The Longhorn estimated that between 100,000 and 200,000 persons a week listened to the program.

== Historical and educational contribution ==
Many significant events of early 1980s science fiction—including the appearance of major novels, stories, movies, and television productions—are reflected in The Science Fiction Radio Show's interviews.

Gordon R. Dickson discussed his novel, The Final Encyclopedia, just as he sent it off to the publisher as a 1,400-page manuscript. Stephen R. Donaldson discussed his book White Gold Wielder, which completed his second trilogy on Thomas Covenant. Philip José Farmer reminisced over his Riverworld books as the fourth volume in the series, The Magic Labyrinth, was published. Gregory Benford talked about Timescape,

Michael Whelan was interviewed at a convention where he took the show's producers on a tour of his art exhibition—with commentary that became a week's worth of interviews. Ray Bradbury discussed his book Something Wicked This Way Comes as it debuted as a film. Jim Henson was working on his fantasy movie The Dark Crystal when he interviewed with the show.

== Transition to a book ==
In summer 1983 Oryx Press expressed interest in publishing the interviews. The work required to prepare a book meant that there was no time to continue with the radio show. It was cancelled in December 1983.

The book, The Sound of Wonder, came out in two volumes in late 1985 and has since gone out of print. The Philip José Farmer interview from Volume 2, for instance, was added to a reference work on Farmer in 2015.

Vernon and Carson were invited as guests to the New Orleans Science Fiction Fantasy Festival in June 1989 where they participated in various panel discussions.

== Legacy ==
The Science Fiction Radio Show produced 81 interviews, the great majority of them with authors. A typical interview lasted between one and two hours. By the end of the show, the interviews extended over 255 reel-to-reel tapes. In 1995 the owners of the tapes donated the archive (which also included 191 cassette tapes) to the Science Fiction Oral History Association, headed by Lloyd Biggle Jr, . It was understood that the organization would digitize the tapes and distribute copies among public research institutions.

At the time of Biggle's death in 2002 very few of the tapes and been digitized and given to research facilities. A handful have shown up at the Vincent Voice Library at the Michigan State University in East Lansing, Michigan, but at the time the majority of the tapes were still undigitized.

In June 2020 David Carson contacted Jeremy Brett at the Science Fiction and Fantasy Research Collection at the Cushing Memorial Library and Archives at Texas A&M University in College Station, Texas. Radio Show personnel had attended several science fiction conventions called Aggiecon's at A&M. Carson remembered the library at A&M had a science fiction collection and wondered if they might be interested in housing the tapes. Brett said they were interested and asked Carson to set up a meeting with the SFOHA. Carson contacted the current staff of the SFOHA and a meeting was held where the SFOHA agreed to moving the tapes to A&M for safe keeping and digitization of the tapes. COVID-19 complicated matters and it was over a year before the tapes where shipped to A&M in the summer of 2021. The tapes have been digitized and are now available at the Science Fiction and Fantasy Research Collection at the Cushing Memorial Library and Archives at Texas A&M University in College Station, Texas.

The tapes can be found at: The Science Fiction Radio Show Digitized Tapes
