= Steel Brother =

Short story collection by Gordon R. Dickson

- Cover of the first edition
- Author: Gordon R. Dickson
- Cover artist: Alan Gutierrez
- Language: English
- Genre: Science fiction
- Publisher: Tor Books
- Publication date: 1985
- Publication place: United States
- Media type: Print (paperback)
- Pages: 236 pp
- ISBN: 0-8125-3552-9
- OCLC: 13000290

Steel Brother is a collection of science fiction stories by Gordon R. Dickson. It was first published by Tor Books in 1985 and reprints most of the stories from Dickson's 1984 collection Dickson!, with one substitution and one added interview. The stories originally appeared in the magazines SFWA Bulletin, Astounding, Galaxy Science Fiction, Analog Science Fiction and Fact, Ellery Queen's Mystery Magazine and Science Fiction Stories. The book contains the introduction to each story by Sandra Miesel from the previous collection, though they are not credited.

== Contents ==
- Introduction, by Poul Anderson
- "Out of the Darkness"
- "The Man in the Mailbag"
- "The Hard Way"
- "Perfectly Adjusted"
- "Steel Brother"
- "Childe Cycle: Status 1984"
- A Conversation with Gordon R. Dickson, by Sandra Miesel
