= Survival! =

- Cover of the first edition
- Author: Gordon R. Dickson
- Cover artist: Alan Gutierrez
- Language: English
- Genre: Science fiction
- Publisher: Baen Books
- Publication date: 1984
- Publication place: United States
- Media type: Print (paperback)
- Pages: 279
- ISBN: 0-671-55927-3
- OCLC: 11616213

Survival! is a collection of science fiction stories by American writer Gordon R. Dickson. It was first published by Baen Books in 1984. Most of the stories originally appeared in the magazines Astounding, Fantasy and Science Fiction, If, Imagination, Fantastic, Infinity Science Fiction, Future and Venture

== Contents ==
- Preface, by Sandra Miesel
- "The Question"
- "Our First Death"
- "No Shield from the Dead"
- "The Underground"
- "After the Funeral"
- "The General and the Axe"
- "Button, Button"
- "Rescue"
- "Friend for Life"
- "Carry Me Home"
- "Jean Duprès"
- "Breakthrough Gang"
