= Hoka (disambiguation) =

Hoka is an athletic shoe company.

Hoka may also refer to:

- Hoka!, a 1983 collection of science fiction stories by Poul Anderson and Gordon Dickson
- Høka, a Norwegian vehicle bodywork company

== See also ==
- Hoka Hoka Kazoku, Japanese anime television series
