= Guided Tour =

Guided Tour may refer to:

- Guided tour
- Guided Tour (Gary Burton album), 2013
- Guided Tour (High Vis album), 2024
- Guided Tour (short story collection), a collection of science fiction stories by Gordon R. Dickson
