= 39th World Science Fiction Convention =

39th Worldcon (1981)

Denvention II, the 39th World Science Fiction Convention
- Genre: Science fiction
- Dates: 3–7 September 1981
- Venue: Sheraton Denver Downtown Hotel
- Location: Denver, Colorado
- Country: United States
- Attendance: 3,792
- Filing status: non-profit

The 39th World Science Fiction Convention (Worldcon), also known as Denvention II, was held on 3–7 September 1981 at the Sheraton Denver Downtown Hotel in Denver, Colorado, United States.

The chairmen were Suzanne Carnival and Don C. Thompson.

== Participants ==
Attendance was 3,792.

=== Guests of honor ===
- Clifford D. Simak (pro)
- C. L. Moore (pro)
- Rusty Hevelin (fan)
- Ed Bryant (toastmaster)

== Awards ==
The World Science Fiction Society administers and presents the Hugo Awards, the oldest and most noteworthy award for science fiction. Selection of the recipients is by vote of the Worldcon members. Categories include novels and short fiction, artwork, dramatic presentations, and various professional and fandom activities.

Other awards may be presented at Worldcon at the discretion of the individual convention committee. This has often included the national SF awards of the host country, such as the Japanese Seiun Awards as part of Nippon 2007, and the Prix Aurora Awards as part of Anticipation in 2009. The Astounding Award for Best New Writer and the Sidewise Award, though not sponsored by the Worldcon, are usually presented, as well as the Chesley Awards, the Prometheus Award, and others. In 2021, the Nommo Awards began presenting at Worldcon.

=== 1981 Hugo Awards ===
- Best Novel: The Snow Queen by Joan D. Vinge
- Best Novella: "Lost Dorsai" by Gordon R. Dickson
- Best Novelette: "The Cloak and the Staff" by Gordon R. Dickson
- Best Short Story: "Grotto of the Dancing Deer" by Clifford D. Simak
- Best Non-Fiction Book: Cosmos by Carl Sagan
- Best Dramatic Presentation: The Empire Strikes Back
- Best Professional Editor: Edward L. Ferman
- Best Professional Artist: Michael Whelan
- Best Fanzine: Locus, edited by Charles N. Brown
- Best Fan Writer: Susan Wood
- Best Fan Artist: Victoria Poyser

=== Other awards ===
- Special Award: Edward L. Ferman for his effort to expand and improve the field
- John W. Campbell Award for Best New Writer: Somtow Sucharitkul

== See also ==
- Hugo Award
- Science fiction
- Speculative fiction
- World Science Fiction Society
- Worldcon

Preceded by 38th World Science Fiction Convention; Noreascon Two in Boston, Massachusetts, United States (1980)	List of Worldcons; 39th World Science Fiction Convention; Denvention II in Denver, Colorado, United States (1981)	Succeeded by 40th World Science Fiction Convention; Chicon IV in Chicago, Illinois, United States (1982)
