= Monkey wrench (disambiguation) =

A monkey wrench is a type of adjustable spanner.

Monkey wrench may also refer to:

- Pipe wrench, often incorrectly called a monkey wrench
- "Monkey Wrench" (song), by Foo Fighters, 1997
- Monkeywrench Records, an independent United States–based record label
- "The Monkey Wrench", a 1951 short story by Gordon R. Dickson
- Monkeewrench (released later as Want to Play?), a 2003 novel by author team P. J. Tracy
- Monkeywrench, a fictional G.I. Joe character, member of the Dreadnoks faction of Cobra
- Monkeywrenching, a type of sabotage

== See also ==
- Monkey Wretch, a character in Ninjago
