= Bear arms (disambiguation) =

Bear arms or right to bear arms may refer to:

- Right to keep and bear arms, the concept that people have a right to own and carry arms
- The law of heraldic arms governing the display of coats of arms
- Right to Bear Arms (Russian organization), a Russian gun rights group founded by Maria Butina

== See also ==
- The Right to Arm Bears, a collection of three science fiction novellas
- The Right to Bare Arms, a comedy album by Larry the Cable Guy
- Gun ownership
- The forelimbs of bears, an aspect of bear morphology
