= Strictly Confidential =

Strictly Confidential may refer to:

- Confidentiality, an ethical principle
- Strictly Confidential (1919 film), a 1919 American comedy film starring Madge Kennedy
- Broadway Bill or Strictly Confidential, a 1934 American comedy directed by Frank Capra
- Strictly Confidential (1959 film), a British comedy
- Strictly Confidential (2024 film), a 2024 American thriller film
- Strictly Confidential (TV series), a 2006 British drama series
- "Strictly Confidential", a song by Bud Powell from Jazz Giant
- "Strictly Confidential", a song by Roxy Music from For Your Pleasure
- Strictly Confidential, a book by Murray Rothbard
- "Strictly Confidential", a short story by Gordon R. Dickson collected in The Man the Worlds Rejected
