= The Dorsai Companion =

- Cover of the first edition
- Author: Gordon R. Dickson
- Cover artist: Enric
- Language: English
- Series: Childe Cycle
- Genre: Science fiction
- Publisher: Ace Books
- Publication date: 1986
- Publication place: United States
- Media type: Print (Paperback)
- Pages: xiv, 231
- ISBN: 0-441-16026-3
- OCLC: 13816654
- Dewey Decimal: 813/.54 19
- LC Class: PS3554.I328 D6 1986

The Dorsai Companion is a collection of science fiction stories by American writer Gordon R. Dickson, part of his Childe Cycle series. It was first published by Ace Books in 1986. The collection includes a number of articles by Sandra Miesel.

== Contents ==
- Introduction: See a Thousand Years
- Stars of the Childe Cycle: Mercator Projection, by Sandra Miesel
- Worlds of the Childe Cycle, by Sandra Miesel
- The Morgans, by Sandra Miesel
- The Graemes, by Sandra Miesel
- Chronology of the Childe Cycle, by Sandra Miesel
- "Amanda Morgan"
- "Warrior"
- "Lost Dorsai"
- "Brothers"
- When Your Contract Takes You to the Dorsai World, by Sandra Miesel
