= Denvention =

Denvention is the name given to three World Science Fiction Conventions. All three of the conventions were held in Denver, Colorado.

1. Denvention I, 1941
2. Denvention II, 1981
3. Denvention 3, 2008
