= Harb =

Harb may refer to

- Harb (surname)
- Harb tribe in the Arabian peninsula
- Talaat Harb Street in Cairo, Egypt
- Fox Harb'r Golf Resort & Spa, a golf-focused resort in Nova Scotia, Canada
- Beyond the Dar Al-Harb, a collection of three fantasy and science fiction stories by Gordon R. Dickson

== See also ==
- Dar al-Harb, a division of the world in Islam
