= The Man from Earth (short story collection) =

- Cover of the first edition
- Author: Gordon R. Dickson
- Cover artist: David Egge
- Language: English
- Genre: Science fiction
- Publisher: Tor Books
- Publication date: 1983
- Publication place: United States
- Media type: Print (paperback)
- Pages: 288 pp
- ISBN: 0-523-48576-X
- OCLC: 9912791

The Man from Earth is a collection of science fiction stories by American writer Gordon R. Dickson. It was first published by Tor Books in 1983. The stories originally appeared in the magazines Analog Science Fiction and Fact, If, Astounding, Galaxy Science Fiction and Space Stories.

== Contents ==
- "Call Him Lord"
- "The Odd Ones"
- "In the Bone"
- "Danger—Human!"
- "Tiger Green"
- "The Man from Earth"
- "Ancient, My Enemy"
- "The Bleak and Barren Land"
- "Steel Brother"
- "Love Me True"
