= Rod Serling's Devils and Demons =

- Cover of the first edition
- Author: edited by Rod Serling
- Language: English
- Genre: Fantasy and horror
- Publisher: Bantam Books
- Publication date: 1967
- Publication place: United States
- Media type: Print (paperback)
- Pages: 212 pp

Rod Serling's Devils and Demons is an anthology of fantasy and horror stories credited to Rod Serling and ghost edited by Gordon R. Dickson. It was first published by Bantam Books in 1967. Most of the stories originally appeared in the magazines Fantasy and Science Fiction, The English Review, New Budget, Worlds of Tomorrow, New York Herald, Routledge’s Christmas Annual, The Smart Set and The Civil and Military Gazette.

== Contents ==
- Introduction, by Rod Serling
- "The Montavarde Camera", by Avram Davidson
- "The Coach", by Violet Hunt
- "Adapted", by Carol Emshwiller
- "Death Cannot Wither", by Judith Merril
- "The Story of the Goblins Who Stole a Sexton", by Charles Dickens
- "Pollock and the Porroh Man", by H. G. Wells
- "Stars, Won’t You Hide Me?", by Ben Bova
- "The Bottle Imp", by Robert Louis Stevenson
- "The Adventure of the German Student", by Washington Irving
- "The Four-Fifteen Express", by Amelia B. Edwards
- "The Blue Sphere", by Theodore Dreiser
- "The Bisara of Pooree", by Rudyard Kipling
- "A Time to Keep", by Kate Wilhelm
- "Brother Coelestin", by Emil Frida
