= In the Bone =

In the Bone: The Best Science Fiction of Gordon R. Dickson
- Cover of the first edition
- Author: Gordon R. Dickson
- Cover artist: Richard Corben
- Language: English
- Genre: Science fiction
- Publisher: Ace Books
- Publication date: 1987
- Publication place: United States
- Media type: Print (Paperback)
- Pages: 228 pp
- ISBN: 0-441-37049-7
- OCLC: 15339637

In the Bone: The Best Science Fiction of Gordon R. Dickson is a collection of science fiction stories by Gordon R. Dickson. It was first published by Ace Books in 1987 and expandsupon Dickson's upon earlier collection, Gordon R. Dickson's SF Best (1978), published by Dell in 1978 and was edited by James R. Frenkel. Most of the stories had appeared in the magazines Analog Science Fiction and Fact, Fantasy and Science Fiction, Satellite and If.

== Contents ==
=== Gordon R. Dickson's SF Best ===
Cover of the first edition of Gordon R. Dickson's SF Best

- Introduction - The Quiet Giant, by Spider Robinson
- Foreword, by James R. Frenkel
- "Hilifter"
- "Brother Charlie"
- "Act of Creation"
- "Idiot Solvant"
- "Call Him Lord"
- "Tiger Green"
- "Of the People"
- "Dolphin’s Way"
- "In the Bone"
- Gordon R. Dickson Bibliography

=== In the Bone ===
- "Twig"
- "God Bless Them"
- "Hilifter"
- "Brother Charlie"
- "Act of Creation"
- "Idiot Solvant"
- "Call Him Lord"
- "Tiger Green"
- "Of the People"
- "Dolphin’s Way"
- "In the Bone"

== Sources ==
- Brown, Charles N.; William G. Contento. "The Locus Index to Science Fiction (1984-1998)".
- "Internet Speculative Fiction Database".
- Clute, John; Peter Nicholls (1995). The Encyclopedia of Science Fiction. New York: St. Martin's Griffin. p. 332. ISBN 0-312-13486-X.
- Contento, William G. "Index to Science Fiction Anthologies and Collections". Archived from the original on 2008-01-06.
- McMuray, Clifford R. (March 1979), "Review of Gordon R. Dickson's SF Best", Science Fiction Review, 8 (2): 54
- Robinson, Spider (June 1978). "The Reference Library". Analog Science Fiction and Fact. 98 (6). Condé Nast Publications, Inc.: 174.
- "Internet Speculative Fiction Database".
