= Hoka! Hoka! Hoka! =

Book by Poul Anderson and Gordon Dickson

- Cover of the first edition
- Author: Poul Anderson and Gordon Dickson
- Cover artist: Stephen Hickman
- Language: English
- Genre: Science fiction
- Publisher: Baen Books
- Publication date: 1998
- Publication place: United States
- Media type: Print (paperback)
- Pages: 305
- ISBN: 0-671-57774-3
- OCLC: 40155040

Hoka! Hoka! Hoka! is a collection of science fiction stories by Poul Anderson and Gordon Dickson. It was first published by Baen Books in 1998 and reprints the authors' earlier collection, Earthman's Burden, expanded with two additional stories from Hoka!. The story "Don Jones" originally appeared in Earthman's Burden. The other stories originally appeared in the magazines Other Worlds, Universe and Fantasy and Science Fiction.

== Contents ==
- Prologue
- "The Sheriff of Canyon Gulch"
- Interlude I
- "Don Jones"
- Interlude II
- "In Hoka Signo Vinces"
- Interlude III
- "The Adventure of the Misplaced Hound"
- Interlude IV
- "Yo Ho Hoka!"
- Interlude V
- "The Tiddlywink Warriors"
- Interlude VI
- "Joy in Mudville"
- "Undiplomatic Immunity"
- Mysterious Message

== See also ==
- Hoka!

== Sources ==
- Brown, Charles N.; William G. Contento. "The Locus Index to Science Fiction (1984–1998)".
