= Combat SF =

- Author: Edited by Gordon R. Dickson
- Cover artist: Robert Aulicino
- Language: English
- Genre: Science fiction
- Publisher: Doubleday
- Publication date: 1975
- Publication place: United States
- Media type: Print (hardback)
- Pages: ix, 204 pp
- ISBN: 0-385-04575-1
- OCLC: 1372405
- Dewey Decimal: 813/.0876
- LC Class: PZ1 .C727 PS648.S3

Combat SF is an anthology of science fiction stories edited by Gordon R. Dickson. It was first published by Doubleday in 1975. Most of the stories originally appeared in the magazines Analog Science Fiction and Fact, Galaxy Science Fiction, Fantastic Universe, New Worlds, Fantasy and Science Fiction, If and Planet Stories.

== Contents ==
- Combat SF: Introduction, by Gordon R. Dickson
- "The Last Command", by Keith Laumer
- "Men of Good Will", by Ben Bova & Myron R. Lewis
- "The Pair", by Joe L. Hensley
- "The Butcher’s Bill", by David Drake
- "Single Combat", by Joseph Green
- "The Man Who Came Early", by Poul Anderson
- "Patron of the Arts", by Fred Saberhagen
- "Time Piece", by Joe W. Haldeman
- "Ricochet on Miza", by Gordon R. Dickson
- "No War, or Battle’s Sound", by Harry Harrison
- "His Truth Goes Marching On", by Jerry E. Pournelle
- "The HORARS of War", by Gene Wolfe
