= Blood and War =

1993 anthology by Gordon R. Dickson

The Harriers, Book Two: Blood and War
- Cover of the first edition
- Editor: Gordon R. Dickson
- Cover artist: Nan Fredman
- Language: English
- Series: War and Honor
- Genre: Science fiction Short stories
- Publisher: Baen books
- Publication date: 1993
- Publication place: United States
- Media type: Print (Paperback)
- Pages: 237 pp
- ISBN: 0-671-72181-X
- OCLC: 317915606
- LC Class: MLC R CP00776
- Preceded by: The Harriers

The Harriers, Book Two: Blood and War is a 1993 anthology of shared world short stories, edited by Gordon R. Dickson. The stories are set in a world created by Dickson and are original to this collection.

== Contents ==
- "The Noble Savages", by David Drake
- "Down Among the Dead Men", by Gordon R. Dickson & Chelsea Quinn Yarbro
- "Mission of Mercy", by Christopher Stasheff
