= The Harriers =

Science fiction anthology book edited by Gordon R. Dickson

- Cover of the first edition
- Author: edited by Gordon R. Dickson
- Language: English
- Series: War and Honor
- Genre: Science fiction Short stories
- Publisher: Baen books
- Publication date: 1991
- Publication place: United States
- Media type: Print (Paperback)
- Pages: 258 pp
- ISBN: 0-671-72048-1
- OCLC: 23282999
- Followed by: Blood and War

The Harriers is a 1991 anthology of shared world short stories, edited by Gordon R. Dickson. The stories are set in a world created by Dickson and are original to this collection.

== Contents ==
- "Of War and Codes and Honor", by Gordon R. Dickson & Chelsea Quinn Yarbro
- "Into the Hot and Moist", by Steve Perry
- "Tonight We Improvise", by S. N. Lewitt
