= Hector Berthelot =

Canadian lawyer, journalist and publisher (1842-1895)

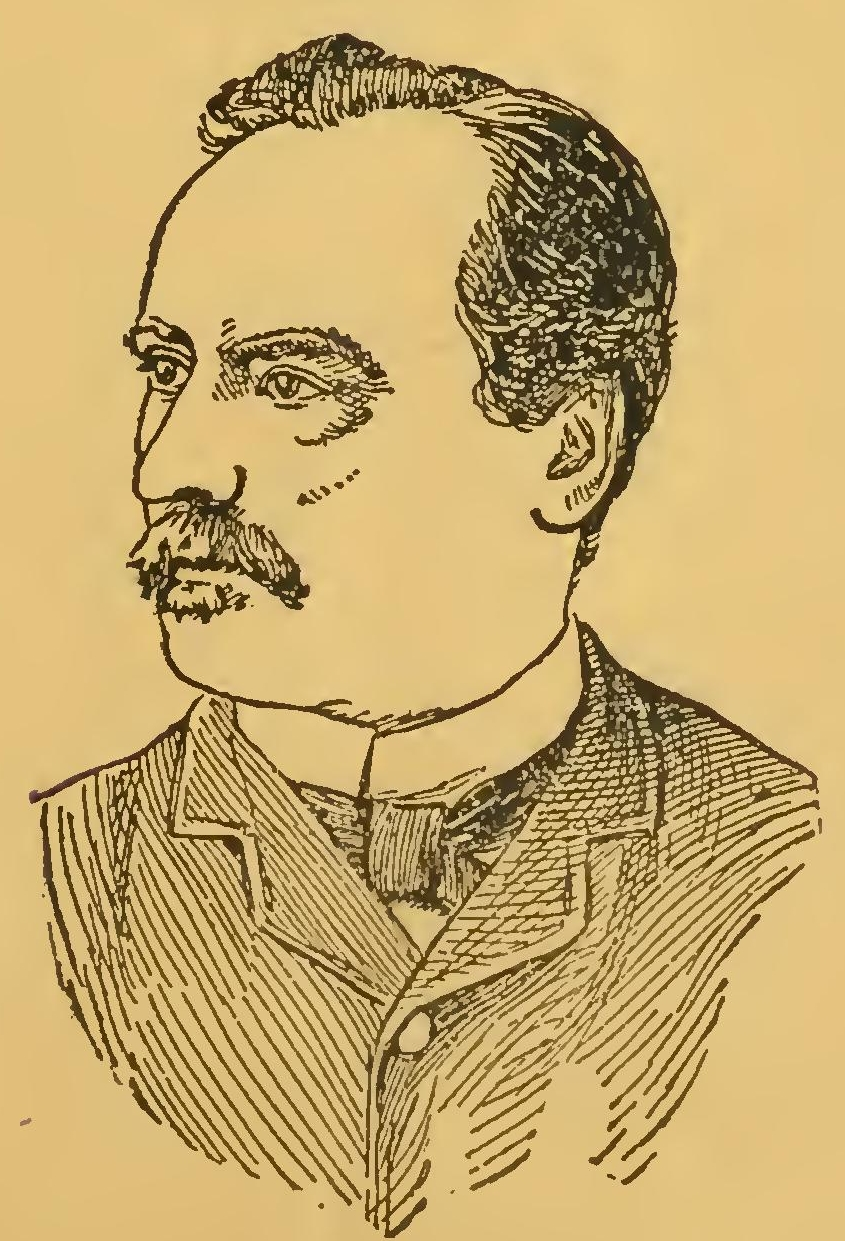
Hector Berthelot

Hector Berthelot (March 4, 1842 – September 15, 1895) was a Canadian lawyer, journalist, columnist, satirist, caricaturist, photographer and publisher who was born in Trois-Rivières. He was not married and died in Montreal. He is most well known for founding various satirical magazines, of which Le Canard was the most famous.

== Biography ==
Hector completed his education at the Collège Sainte-Marie in Montreal. Berthelot articled as a lawyer with George-Étienne Cartier in 1861 and was called to the bar in 1865. However, he did not practice law but began with his journalistic pursuits for which he would become well known. He did practice law extensively but it was journalism and publishing that interested him most. One of his publishing endeavours, Le Canard, became a rapid success. He turned this publication over to Honoré Beaugrand in August 1879. He immediately launched other publications.

Hector Berthelot was mourned after his death by his contemporaries in the newspapers. All the tributes seem to indicate an accomplished humorist and a journalist of the first order.

His niece Henriette Tassé also became a journalist and published a 1934 biography of Berthelot La vie humoristique d'Hector Berthelot.
