= Danger—Human =

Short story collection by Gordon R. Dickson

- First edition
- Author: Gordon R. Dickson
- Cover artist: Peter Rauch
- Language: English
- Series: Book of ... series
- Genre: Science fiction short stories
- Publisher: Doubleday
- Publication date: 1970
- Publication place: United States
- Media type: Print (hardback)
- Pages: 228
- Preceded by: The Book of Philip K. Dick
- Followed by: The Book of Philip José Farmer

Danger—Human is a collection of science fiction stories by Gordon R. Dickson. It was first published in hardcover by Doubleday in 1970, and reprinted by the same publisher in June 1971. It was subsequently reissued in paperback by DAW Books in May 1973 under the title The Book of Gordon Dickson as the sixth volume in its Book of ... series. The book has also been translated into German. The stories originally appeared in the magazines Astounding, Analog Science Fiction and Fact, If, Galaxy Science Fiction and Fantasy and Science Fiction.

== Summary ==
The collection consists of thirteen short works of fiction by the author; the paperback version includes a frontispiece by artist Jack Gaughan.

== Contents ==
- "Danger—Human!"
- "Dolphin's Way"
- "And Then There Was Peace"
- "The Man from Earth"
- "Black Charlie"
- "Zeepsday"
- "Lulungomeena"
- "An Honorable Death"
- "Flat Tiger"
- "James"
- "The Quarry"
- "Call Him Lord"
- "Steel Brother"

== Reception ==
Harlan Ellison, in an assessment quoted on the back cover of the DAW Books paperback edition, wrote "The kudos go to Gordon Dickson, a man who has been writing science fiction for twenty years yet has somehow been overlooked when lists of the top writers are assembled. Eschewing pyrotechnics and trickery, he has long been amassing a body of short stories that are startlingly impressive when gathered together. The thirteen fictions range from studies of alien cultures in contact and conflict with humans to examination of men under the vise-pressure of future shock. Dolphin's Way in particular, is a story of such emotional originality that it easily commends itself to the attention of any English professor seeking a model for the perfect modern short story."

Theodore Sturgeon in Galaxy Science Fiction Magazine writes "Gordon Dickson's 1970 collection, Danger—Human, is out in paperback as The Book of Gordon Dickson (DAW, 95¢.) He writes with enormous competence and in this collection are two of my own great favorites, Dolphin's Way and Lulungomeena, as well as eleven others. Good book ..."

Spider Robinson, also in Galaxy Science Fiction Magazine, calls the DAW reprint "a representative selection of a master's work in short stories, contain[ing] the classic "Danger—Human" and 1966 Nebula-winner "Call Him Lord," (a simply splendid story) plus other good stuff, [for which the] only excuse for failure to purchase is prior possession."

The book was also reviewed by Tony Lewis in Locus #146 August 11, 1973.
