= Ancient, My Enemy =

- Dust-jacket from the first edition
- Author: Gordon R. Dickson
- Cover artist: Peter Rauch
- Language: English
- Genre: Science fiction
- Publisher: Doubleday
- Publication date: 1974
- Publication place: United States
- Media type: Print (hardback)
- Pages: 226 pp
- ISBN: 0-385-05202-2
- OCLC: 940556
- Dewey Decimal: 813/.5/4
- LC Class: PZ4.D553 An PS3554.I328

Ancient, My Enemy is a collection of science fiction stories by American writer Gordon R. Dickson. It was first published by Doubleday in 1974. The stories originally appeared in the magazines If, Astounding, Analog Science Fiction and Fact, Space Stories and Fantasy and Science Fiction.

== Contents ==
- "Ancient, My Enemy"
- "The Odd Ones"
- "The Monkey Wrench"
- "Tiger Green"
- "The Friendly Man"
- "Love Me True"
- "Our First Death"
- "In the Bone"
- "The Bleak and Barren Land"
