= Lost Dorsai (short story collection) =

- Cover of the first edition
- Author: Gordon R. Dickson
- Illustrator: Fernando Fernandez
- Language: English
- Series: Childe Cycle
- Genre: Science fiction short stories
- Publisher: Ace Books
- Publication date: 1980
- Publication place: United States
- Media type: Print (Paperback)
- Pages: 287 pp
- ISBN: 0-441-49299-1
- OCLC: 6755438
- Dewey Decimal: 813/.54 19
- LC Class: PS3554.I328 L6

Lost Dorsai is a collection of science fiction stories by Gordon R. Dickson from his Childe Cycle series. It was first published by Ace Books in 1980. The collection includes two stories that originally appeared in the anthology series Destinies, one that appeared in the magazine Analog Science Fiction and Fact and an excerpt from Dickson's novel The Final Encyclopedia.

== Contents ==
- "Lost Dorsai"
- "Warrior"
- "The Plume and the Sword"
- The Final Encyclopedia: An Excerpt
