= Honoré Beaugrand =

French Canadian journalist and politician (1848-1906)

Mayor Honoré Beaugrand
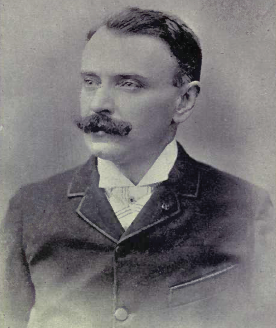

18th Mayor of Montreal
- In office 1885–1887
- Preceded by: Jean-Louis Beaudry
- Succeeded by: John Abbott

Personal details
- Born: 24 March 1848 Saint-Joseph-de-Lanoraie, Canada East
- Died: 7 October 1906 (aged 58) Montreal, Quebec, Canada
- Profession: Author, journalist, publisher, soldier

Honoré Beaugrand (24 March 1848 – 7 October 1906) was a French Canadian journalist, politician, author and folklorist, born in Saint-Joseph-de-Lanoraie, Quebec.

== Early life ==
Honoré was born in Saint-Joseph-de-Lanoraie on march 24, 1848. His father, Louis Beaugrand, was a sailor married to Marie-Josephte Marion. The couple had 6 kids, 3 boys and 3 girls.

As a young graduate from military school Beaugrand joined the French military forces under General Bazaine in Mexico, supporting the ill-fated emperor Maximilian of Mexico. He returned with those troops to France after the fall of Chapultepec and Maximilian's execution. After some months he moved to New Orleans in 1868 and became a journalist. Subsequently, he wrote for U.S. newspapers in St. Louis, Boston, Chicago, and Lowell and Fall River, Massachusetts.

In 1878, he returned to Canada and founded the newspaper La Patrie in Montreal to take the place of Le National which had recently folded. It ceased publication in 1957, after 78 years. In August 1879 he acquired Le Canard from publisher and satirist Hector Berthelot. He made a name as a political writer and reporter, and in 1885 received the cross of the French Légion d'honneur.

He became a freemason in 1873 and took part in the foundation of Montreal Émancipation lodge in 1897.

He was elected mayor of Montreal in 1885. Today, a street in Montreal and the Honoré-Beaugrand station on the green line of the Montreal metro are named in his honour. He is most famous in Quebec for writing down the legend of the "Chasse-galerie", published in 1891 in La chasse galerie: légendes canadiennes, which also included "Le loup-garou," "La bête à grand'queue," "Macloune," and "Le père Louison." He also published English-language version of "Le loup-garou" ("The Werwolves") in a 1898 edition of The Century, under the name Henry Beaugrand.

== Publications ==
- Anita
- Jeanne la fileuse
- Contes Canadiens
- La Chasse-galerie et autres récits

== Gallery ==
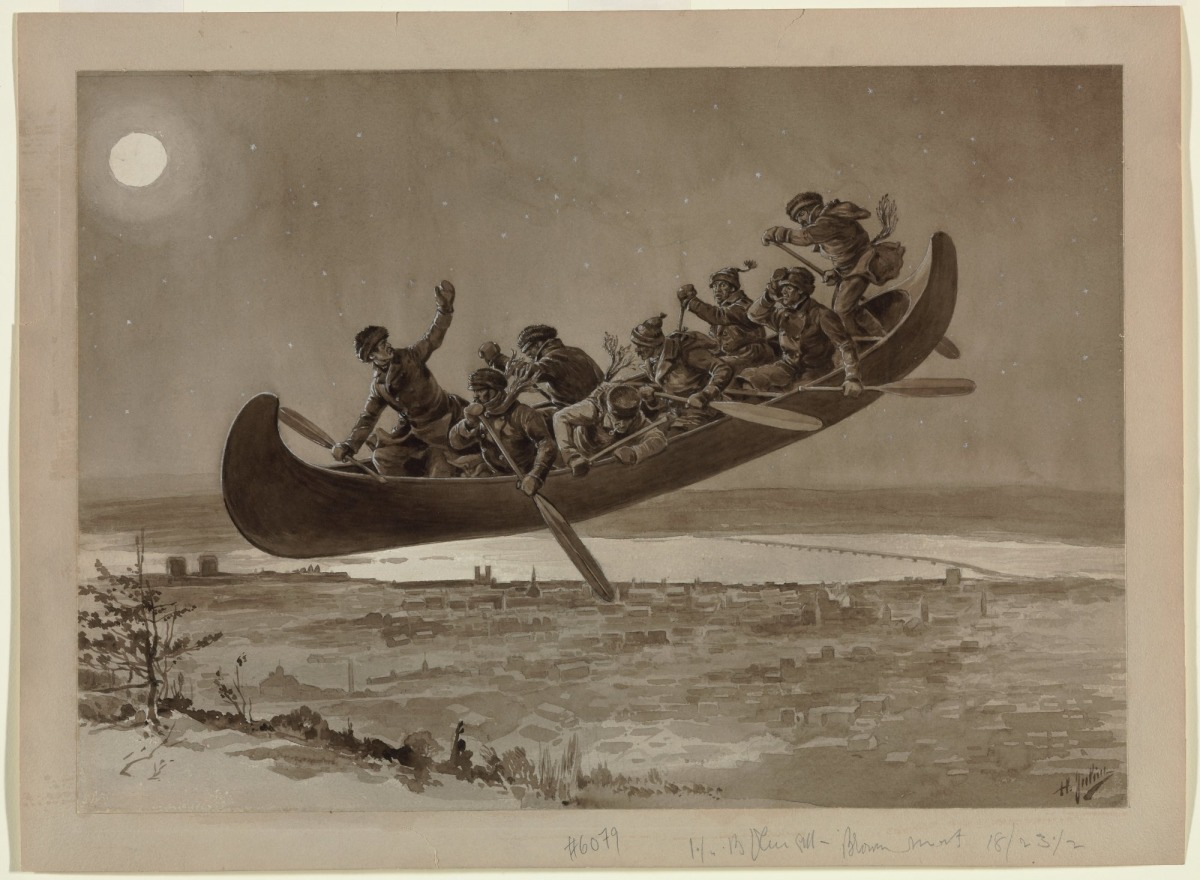
La chasse galerie, Illustration from Henri Julien Quebec museum

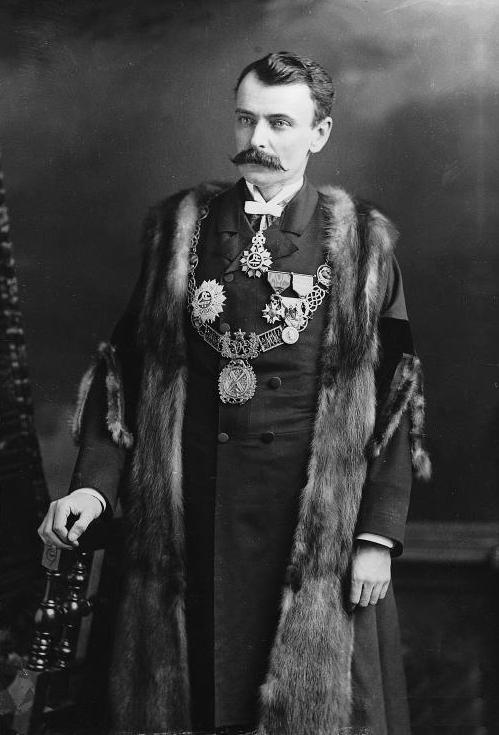
As mayor of Montreal

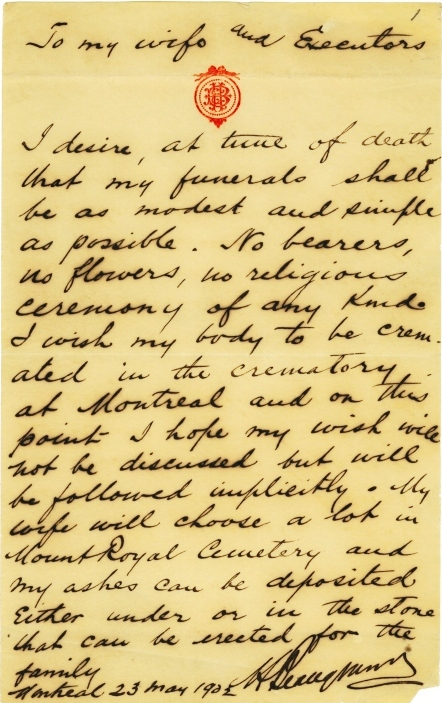
Last wishes of Honoré Beaugrand
