= The Last Dream =

- Cover of the first edition
- Author: Gordon R. Dickson
- Cover artist: James Warhola
- Language: English
- Genre: Fantasy, science fiction
- Publisher: Baen Books
- Publication date: 1986
- Publication place: United States
- Media type: Print (paperback)
- Pages: 263 pp
- ISBN: 0-671-65559-0
- OCLC: 13388183

The Last Dream is a collection of fantasy and science fiction stories by American writer Gordon R. Dickson. It was first published by Baen Books in 1986. Most of the stories originally appeared in the magazines Fantasy and Science Fiction, Analog Science Fiction and Fact, Fantastic, Startling Stories and Worlds of Fantasy.

== Contents ==
- Introduction, by Sandra Miesel
- "St. Dragon and the George"
- "The Present State of Igneos Research"
- "Ye Prentice and Ye Dragon"
- "A Case History"
- "The Girl Who Played Wolf"
- "Salmanazar"
- "With Butter and Mustard"
- "The Amulet"
- "The Haunted Village"
- "The Three"
- "Walker Between the Planes"
- "The Last Dream"
