= Invaders! (short story collection) =

- Cover of the first edition
- Author: Gordon R. Dickson
- Cover artist: Bryn Barnard
- Language: English
- Genre: Science fiction
- Publisher: Baen Books
- Publication date: 1985
- Publication place: United States
- Media type: Print (paperback)
- Pages: 253
- ISBN: 0-671-55994-X
- OCLC: 13000725

Invaders! is a collection of science fiction stories by American writer Gordon R. Dickson. It was first published by Baen Books in 1985 and was edited by Sandra Miesel. Most of the stories originally appeared in the magazines Astounding, Cosmos, Orbit, Planet Stories, If, Fantasy and Science Fiction and Space Stories.

== Contents ==
- Introduction, by Sandra Miesel
- "The Error of Their Ways"
- "Itco’s Strong Right Arm"
- "Fellow of the Bees"
- "Ricochet on Miza"
- "The Law-Twister Shorty"
- "An Ounce of Emotion"
- "Roofs of Silver"
- "The Invaders"
