= Forward! =

- Cover of the first edition
- Author: Gordon R. Dickson
- Cover artist: Paul Chadwick
- Language: English
- Genre: Science fiction
- Publisher: Baen Books
- Publication date: 1985
- Publication place: United States
- Media type: Print (paperback)
- Pages: 242
- ISBN: 0-671-55971-0
- OCLC: 12359899

Forward! is a collection of science fiction stories by American writer Gordon R. Dickson. It was first published by Baen Books in 1985, and was edited by Sandra Miesel. Most of the stories originally appeared in the magazines Galaxy Science Fiction, Other Worlds, Fantasy and Science Fiction and Orbit.

== Contents ==
- Editor's Introduction, by Sandra Miesel
- "Building on the Line"
- "Babes in the Wood"
- "Napoleon’s Skullcap"
- "Rescue Mission"
- "Robots are Nice?"
- "The Dreamsman"
- "The R of A"
- "One on Trial"
- "The Queer Critter"
- "Twig"
- "The Game of Five"
- "Guided Tour"

== Sources ==
- Brown, Charles N.; William G. Contento. "The Locus Index to Science Fiction (1984-1998)".
- Clute, John; Peter Nicholls (1995). The Encyclopedia of Science Fiction. New York: St. Martin's Griffin. p. 331. ISBN 0-312-13486-X.
- Lewis, Arthur O. (August 1985), "Another Recycling", Fantasy Review, 8 (8): 16–18, ISSN 0747-234X
- "Internet Speculative Fiction Database".
