= Henriette Tassé =

Canadian journalist and writer (1870-1964)

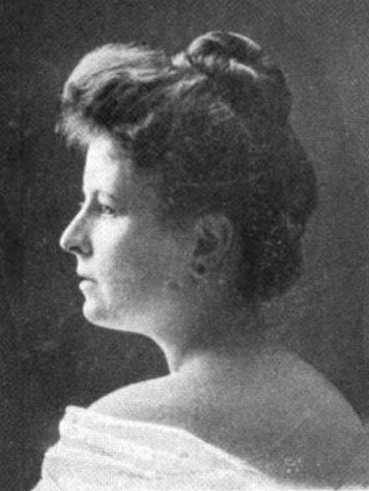
- Born: September 23, 1870; Quebec City, Canada
- Died: 1964 (aged 93–94)
- Occupations: Journalist, writer
- Spouse: Gustave Tassé (m. 1892)

Henriette Tassé (née Lionais; September 23, 1870 – 1964) was a Quebec journalist and writer.

== Biography ==
The daughter of Charles Lionais and Émilie Berthelot, she was born Henriette Lionais in Quebec City and was educated at the convent of the Sisters of the Holy Names of Jesus and Mary in Hochelaga. In 1892, she married Gustave Tassé.

In 1915, Tassé published her first book La vie et le rêve. That was followed by De tout un peu in 1923, La femme et la civilisation in 1927 and Les salons français in 1930. In 1934, she published La vie humoristique d'Hector Berthelot, a biography of her uncle Hector Berthelot.

Tassé wrote articles for various journals and magazines under her own name, as well as under pseudonyms such as Mistigri or Une progressiste. She was secretary of the Comité provincial pour le suffrage féminin (Provincial committee for women's suffrage) and served on the executive of the Montreal Central Liberal Women's Club (Club libéral central des femmes de Montréal).
