= The Man the Worlds Rejected =

- Cover of the first edition
- Author: Gordon R. Dickson
- Cover artist: Alan Gutierrez
- Language: English
- Genre: Science fiction
- Publisher: Tor Books
- Publication date: 1986
- Publication place: United States
- Media type: Print (paperback)
- Pages: 250
- ISBN: 0-8125-3572-3
- OCLC: 14115451

The Man the Worlds Rejected is a collection of science fiction stories by American writer Gordon R. Dickson. It was first published by Tor Books in 1986. Most of the stories originally appeared in the magazines Planet Stories, Analog Science Fiction and Fact, If, Fantastic Universe and Fantasy and Science Fiction.

== Contents ==
- "The Man the Worlds Rejected"
- "Jackal’s Meal"
- "Minotaur"
- "Turnabout"
- "Strictly Confidential"
- "In Iron Years"
- "The Monster and the Maiden"
- "A Matter of Perspective"
