= The Human Edge =

- Cover of the first edition
- Editor: Hank Davis
- Author: Gordon R. Dickson
- Cover artist: David B. Mattingly
- Language: English
- Genre: Science fiction
- Publisher: Baen Books
- Publication date: 2003
- Publication place: United States
- Media type: Print (paperback)
- Pages: 406
- ISBN: 0-7434-7174-1
- OCLC: 59286658
- LC Class: PS3554.I328

The Human Edge is a collection of science fiction stories by American writer Gordon R. Dickson. It was first published by Baen Books in 2003 and was edited by Hank Davis. The stories had originally appeared in such as magazines Astounding SF, Analog Science Fiction and Fact, If, Fantasy and Science Fiction and Worlds of Tomorrow.

== Contents ==
- "Introduction: The Dickson Edge", by Hank Davis
- "Danger—Human"
- "Sleight of Wit"
- "In the Bone"
- "3-Part Puzzle"
- "An Ounce of Emotion"
- "Brother Charlie"
- "The Game of Five"
- "Tiger Green"
- "The Hard Way"
- "Jackal’s Meal"
- "On Messenger Mountain"
- "The Catch"

== Sources ==
- Brown, Charles N.; William G. Contento. "The Locus Index to Science Fiction (2003)".
