= In Iron Years =

- First edition
- Author: Gordon R. Dickson
- Cover artist: Soren Arutyunyan
- Language: English
- Genre: Science fiction
- Publisher: Doubleday
- Publication date: 1980
- Publication place: United States
- Media type: Print (hardback)
- Pages: 250
- ISBN: 0-385-01555-0
- OCLC: 6378191
- Dewey Decimal: 813/.54
- LC Class: PS3554.I328 I5

In Iron Years is a collection of science fiction stories by American writer Gordon R. Dickson. It was first published by Doubleday in 1980. Most of the stories originally appeared in the magazines Fantasy and Science Fiction, If, Galaxy Science Fiction and Astounding.

== Contents ==
- "In Iron Years"
- "Homecoming"
- "A Taste of Tenure"
- "The Hours Are Good"
- "Gifts"
- "Zeepsday"
- "Things Which Are Caesar’s"
