= Guided Tour (short story collection) =

1988 collection of stories by Gordon R. Dickson

- Cover of the first edition
- Author: Gordon R. Dickson
- Cover artist: David Lee Anderson
- Language: English
- Genre: Science fiction
- Publisher: Tor Books
- Publication date: 1988
- Publication place: United States
- Media type: Print (paperback)
- Pages: 244
- ISBN: 0-8125-3589-8
- OCLC: 17397638

Guided Tour is a collection of science fiction stories by American writer Gordon R. Dickson. It was first published by Tor Books in 1988. The majority the stories had originally appeared in the magazines The Magazine of Fantasy & Science Fiction, Astounding, Planet Stories, Analog Science Fiction and Fact, Future, Science Fiction Stories, If, Galaxy Science Fiction, Imagination, Fantastic Universe and Fantastic Story Magazine.

== Contents ==
- "Guided Tour"
- "The Monkey Wrench"
- "The Star Fool"
- "Hilifter"
- "Counter-Irritant"
- "Last Voyage"
- "An Ounce of Emotion"
- "Rehabilitated"
- "Lulungomeena"
- "Time Grabber"
- "I’ve Been Trying to Tell You"
- "Flat Tiger"
- "The Rebels"
- "The Mousetrap"
