= The Stranger (short story collection) =

Collection of science fiction stories

- Cover of the first edition
- Author: Gordon R. Dickson
- Cover artist: David Lee Anderson
- Language: English
- Genre: Science fiction
- Publisher: Tor Books
- Publication date: 1987
- Publication place: United States
- Media type: Print (paperback)
- Pages: 254
- ISBN: 0-8125-3579-0
- OCLC: 15257983

The Stranger is a collection of science fiction stories by American writer Gordon R. Dickson. It was first published by Tor Books in 1987. Most of the stories originally appeared in the magazines Fantasy and Science Fiction, Satellite, Imagination, Astounding, Saturn, Analog Science Fiction and Fact, Fantastic, Science Fiction Stories, Future and If.

== Contents ==
- "God Bless Them"
- "James"
- "E Gubling Dow"
- "The Strange"
- "The Friendly Man"
- "MX Knows Best"
- "The Quarry"
- "Three-Part Puzzle"
- "IT, Out of Darkest Jungle"
- "The Green Building"
- "Tempus Non Fugit"
- "Cloak and Stagger"
- "And Then There Was Peace"
- "The Catch"
