= Earthman's Burden =

1957 collection of stories by Poul Anderson and Gordon R. Dickson

- Dust-jacket from the first edition
- Author: Poul Anderson and Gordon Dickson
- Illustrator: Edd Cartier
- Language: English
- Genre: Science fiction
- Publisher: Gnome Press
- Publication date: 1957
- Publication place: United States
- Media type: Print (hardback)
- Pages: 185

Earthman's Burden is a collection of science fiction stories by American writers Poul Anderson and Gordon R. Dickson. It was first published by Gnome Press in 1957. The stories involve a teddy bear-like alien race known as Hokas, and spoof a variety of fictional genres.

The story "Don Jones" was original to this collection. The other stories originally appeared in the magazines Other Worlds, Universe and Fantasy and Science Fiction.

A sequel story collection appeared in 1983 under the title Hoka!. There was also a later Hoka novel, Star Prince Charlie.

An expanded version of Earthman's Burden with two of the stories from Hoka! appeared under the title Hoka! Hoka! Hoka!.

== Contents ==
- "The Sheriff of Canyon Gulch"
- "Don Jones"
- "In Hoka Signo Vinces"
- "The Adventure of the Misplaced Hound"
- "Yo Ho Hoka!"
- "The Tiddlywink Warriors"

== Reception ==
Floyd C. Gale wrote that the stories in Earthman's Burden were "reasonably amusing. Under one cover and in company with minor works, though, the cumulative effect is less rewarding ... Hoka, like pickles, is a tasty appetizer in moderation, but leaves a characteristic aftertaste if overindulged".

== See also ==
- The White Man's Burden

== Sources ==
- Boucher, Anthony (April 1958), "Recommended Reading", The Magazine of Fantasy and Science Fiction, 14 (4), Mercury Publications: 95
- Chalker, Jack L.; Mark Owings (1998). The Science-Fantasy Publishers: A Bibliographic History, 1923-1998. Westminster, MD and Baltimore: Mirage Press, Ltd. p. 306.
- Clute, John; Peter Nicholls (1995). The Encyclopedia of Science Fiction. New York: St. Martin's Griffin. p. 331. ISBN 0-312-13486-X.
- Contento, William G. "Index to Science Fiction Anthologies and Collections". Archived from the original on January 6, 2008.
- Coulson, Robert (March 1986), "Book Reviews", Amazing Stories, vol. 60, no. 3, TSR, Inc., p. 14
- Gale, Floyd C. (May 1958), "Galaxy's 5 Star Shelf", Galaxy Magazine, vol. 16, no. 1, p. 116
- Knight, Damon (March 1958), "Infinity's Choice", Infinity Science Fiction, vol. 3, no. 3, p. 60
- Miller, P. Schuyler (April 1958). "The Reference Library: Law for the Prophets". Astounding Science Fiction. 61 (2). Street & Smith: 143.
- Reed, Glenn (October 1985), "Hoka Humor", Fantasy Review, vol. 8, no. 10, p. 17, ISSN 0747-234X
- Searles, Baird (March 1980), "On Books", Isaac Asimov's Science Fiction Magazine, vol. 4, no. 3, Davis Publications, p. 15
- Sturgeon, Theodore (January 1958), "On Hand . . . Offhand", Venture Science Fiction Magazine, vol. 2, no. 1, p. 80
- Tuck, Donald H. (1974). The Encyclopedia of Science Fiction and Fantasy. Chicago: Advent. p. 9. ISBN 0-911682-20-1.
