= Love Not Human =

- Cover of the first edition
- Author: Gordon R. Dickson
- Language: English
- Genre: Science fiction short stories
- Publisher: Ace Books
- Publication date: 1981
- Publication place: United States
- Media type: Print (Paperback)
- Pages: 249 pp
- ISBN: 0-441-50414-0
- OCLC: 7474409

Love Not Human is a collection of science fiction stories by Gordon R. Dickson. It was first published by Ace Books in 1981. Most of the stories originally appeared in the magazines Galaxy Science Fiction, Startling Stories, Fantastic, Fantasy and Science Fiction, Universe, Analog Science Fiction and Fact and Amazing Stories.

== Contents ==
- "Black Charlie"
- "Moon, June, Spoon, Croon"
- "The Summer Visitors"
- "Listen"
- "Graveyard"
- "Fido"
- "The Breaking of Jerry McCloud"
- "Love Me True"
- "The Christmas Present"
- "It Hardly Seems Fair"
- "The Monster and the Maiden"

== Plot Summaries ==
"Black Charlie":

An art critic believes he knows what is "art" and what isn't. But when a stranger shows up with a box of figurines, he agrees to meet the artist, who known only as Black Charlie. But when the search for the mysterious artist leads into the swamps of a young planet, he discovers just what it truly means to be called an artist.

"Moon, June, Spoon, Croon":

An edmic computer discovers he is the only one of his kind, and finds he is "alone-ly". Not able to accept that, he subsequently searches for a partner.

"The Summer Visitors":

After a boy climbs a cliff to escape local bullies, he encounters Olympians who teach him courage, wisdom, and humility.

"Listen":

On what appears a typical day, four-year-old Taddy goes on an outing with his guardian, Reru—and discovers how everything in his world is truly interconnected.

"Graveyard":

A blind boy deals with having a mental link with a dog.

"Fido":

The crew of an exploratory spaceship encounters something that raises intelligence in humans and animals alike.

"The Breaking of Jerry McCloud":

A man is torn between losing the woman he loves and his stubborn refusal to compromise. When he goes on a last desperate gamble on a hunt for the elusive Skem, he encounters a whole new perspective on the dynamics of relationships.

"The Christmas Present":

A little boy celebrates Christmas with a gift to his friend Harvey, a swamp-dwelling alien jellyfish. Harvey does not understand, but resolves to give a present in return; the only one he knows how to give.

"The Monster and the Maiden":

In Loch Ness, the Clan has only four surviving members. When the Youngest encounters an injured diver, she resolves to help him; and challenge an ancient taboo against contact with humans.
