= The Star Road =

Short story collection by Gordon R. Dickson

- Dust-jacket from the first edition
- Author: Gordon R. Dickson
- Cover artist: Bill Naegels
- Language: English
- Genre: Science fiction
- Publisher: Doubleday
- Publication date: 1973
- Publication place: United States
- Media type: Print (hardback)
- Pages: 229
- ISBN: 0-385-06811-5
- OCLC: 609366
- Dewey Decimal: 813/.5/4
- LC Class: PZ4.D553 St PS3554.I328

The Star Road is a collection of science fiction stories by American writer Gordon R. Dickson. It was first published by Doubleday in 1973. The stories originally appeared in the magazines Amazing Stories, Astounding, Analog Science Fiction and Fact, Galaxy Science Fiction, Worlds of Tomorrow and Fantasy and Science Fiction.

== Contents ==
- "Whatever Gods There Be"
- "Hilifter"
- "Building on the Line"
- "The Christmas Present"
- "Three-Part Puzzle"
- "On Messenger Mountain"
- "The Catch"
- "Jackal’s Meal"
- "The Mousetrap"

== Reception ==
Theodore Sturgeon declared The Star Road to be "nine fine stories [from] one of the better, solid, reliable storytellers around."

== Sources ==
- "Library of Congress Online Catalog".
- Clute, John; Peter Nicholls (1995). The Encyclopedia of Science Fiction. New York: St. Martin's Griffin. p. 332. ISBN 0-312-13486-X.
- Contento, William G. "Index to Science Fiction Anthologies and Collections". Archived from the original on 2008-01-07.
- Russ, Joanna (February 1974), "Books", The Magazine of Fantasy and Science Fiction, Mercury Publications: 71
- Sturgeon, Theodore (September 1973), "Galaxy Bookshelf", Galaxy Magazine, 34 (8): 88
