= The Outposter =

1971 science fiction novel by Gordon R. Dickson

- 1973 cover of The Outposter book, in its paperback version published by Manor Books.
- Author: Gordon R. Dickson
- Language: English
- Genre: Space opera; Science fiction
- Publisher: Analog Science Fiction and Fact (serialized magazine story), J. B. Lippincott & Co. (first print as a book)
- English publication date: 1971/1972
- Media type: Magazine in a serialized format Book
- ISBN: 0-397-00764-7
- OCLC: 1080122903

The Outposter Is a space opera science fiction novel by Gordon R. Dickson. It was first published as a serialized magazine story in 1971, and published as a book in 1972. The story follows Mark Ten Roos, the leader of a group of planetary colonists pushed out from an overcrowded Earth and their attempt to successfully settle on another planet. They pursue a daring plan to become economically self-sufficient from Earth and learn to defend themselves from the threat of alien raiders.

== Synopsis ==
In the future Earth finds itself being overcrowded. Its government has established a lottery system to send those selected to planetary colonies. The Colonists are sent against their will, but accompanying and supervising them are outposters; volunteers trained to be the leaders and managers of colonies.

Colonists face a difficult life. They are demoralized and unproductive, dependent on supplies from Earth for their continued subsistence. Both Earth and colonists trade with the only alien race they have encountered, the Meda V'Dan. However, some "rogue" Meda V'Dan also raid colonies and pose a constant threat to them, while Earth's space military stand idly by.

The book follows Mark Ten Roos, an up-and-coming young outposter. He was a brilliant student who could have chosen to remain on Earth and pursue more attractive endeavors, but the Meda V'Dan killed his parents when he was a small child, and later crippled his adoptive father. Enlisting as an outposer, Mark has a secret plan of revenge and liberation.

In his first voyage in this role Mark carefully selects some new colonists for his plan. These include a midget woman with a professorship in philosophy; an ex-marine with a dishonorable discharge; a master cabinetmaker; a widowed mathematician; and a highly driven banker and businessman. An attractive daughter of a space admiral also joins in the adventure.

== Reception ==
Lester del Rey writing for Worlds of If magazine in 1972, positively reviewed the book, saying that "Dickson's deep interest in the way the past must affect the future and his always ingenious handling of the sociology of aliens combine to make a very good novel." Del Rey compared The Outposter with Dickson's Dorsai book series (also called the Childe Cycle), saying that while the former might overall not be as good as the latter, the exploration of the value of outcasts from one culture when exposed to a different one gave this The Outposter something not to be found in similar degree in Dickson's previous works. Writing for Analog Science Fiction and Fact in 1973, P. Schuyler Miller came to similar conclusions, also recommending the book. Miller added that Dickson had successfully taken facets of the past (the colonization of America) and translated them into a futuristic setting, achieving "what few historians have managed–tell his story in terms of the people who lived it, and see them as individuals."

In 1985 upon the reprinting of the book by Tor, Ray Thompson writing for Fantasy Review called the book "high adventure on the frontiers of space". Thompson noted that the book neglected characterization, while offering instead an "exciting plot." He also highlighted the fact that it explores the price paid by those who defy convention and authority, a theme more fully explored in the Childe Cycle. Thompson recommended the book, especially for younger readers.

== Literary analysis ==
In a 1980s retrospective of Dickson's work, the journal Canadian Children's Literature noted that Dickson's novels tended to envision a future where marvelous scientific discoveries would enable the heroes of his stories to perform feats impossible at the time the books were written. That sense of freedom and power enabled by the imagined future technological advancements would be especially appealing to an adolescent or young adult reader yearning for independence from their parents. They would be further gratified by having a protagonist who was young and at the start of his career. The Outposter was emblematic of these characteristics, with the youth of the protagonist further contrasted by other characters in the story being older and portraying them as more closed-minded; Mark Ten Roos, unencumbered by experience, was able to be more open-minded and devise new creative solutions in ending the parasitic raids of the alien Meda V'Dan .

Dickson's heroes offer many elements of wish-fulfillment for the adolescent reader, but what gives literary merit to his novels is his refusal to create full escapism through his characters. Instead he endows them with flaws such as selfish indifference to others, originating from injustices befallen on them previously. In Mark Ten Roos's case it was the Meda V'Dan alien race killing his parents, and crippling his adoptive father. Not that Dickson allows these past injuries to be an excuse for his characters. Instead, they are a challenge for his heroes to overcome, take responsibility for their mistakes, and hence mature and have the wisdom and fortitude necessary for them to triumph.

The Encyclopedia of Science Fiction highlighted The Outposter alongside Dickson's The Pritcher Mass as examples of his growing concern with overpopulation and pollution.

== Publication history ==
The Outposter was first released in a serialized format of three installments in 1971 in the magazine Analog Science Fiction and Fact. In 1972 J. B. Lippincott & Co. first published it as a book. It was later reprinted by other publishers, including outside the U.S. In 2018 it was reprinted by Baen Books.

== Author's notes and drafts ==
In 1974 Dickson donated notes, outlines, and drafts for many of his works up to that point, including on The Outposter, to the Manuscripts Division of the University of Minnesota Libraries.
