= Mindspan =

- Cover of the first edition
- Author: Gordon R. Dickson
- Cover artist: Bryn Barnard
- Language: English
- Genre: Science fiction
- Publisher: Baen Books
- Publication date: 1986
- Publication place: United States
- Media type: Print (paperback)
- Pages: 276
- ISBN: 0-671-65580-9
- OCLC: 14045927

Mindspan is a collection of science fiction stories by American writer Gordon R. Dickson. It was first published by Baen Books in 1986. Most of the stories originally appeared in the magazines Fantasy and Science Fiction, Venture, Startling Stories, Galaxy Science Fiction, Analog Science Fiction and Fact and Worlds of Tomorrow.

Stories 4 to 8 were republished in The Magnificent Wilf (1995).

== Contents ==
- "Miss Prinks"
- "Fleegl of Fleegl"
- "Show Me the Way to Go Home"
- "Rex and Mr. Rejilla"
- "Who Dares a Bulbur Eat?"
- "The Faithful Wilf"
- "A Wobble in Wockii Futures"
- "Sleight of Wit"
- "Operation P-Button"
- "Soupstone"
- "Ballad of the Shoshonu"
- "Catch a Tartar"
- "A Matter of Technique"
