= Dickson! =

- Dust-jacket from the first edition
- Author: Gordon R. Dickson
- Cover artist: Frank Kelly Freas
- Language: English
- Genre: Science fiction
- Publisher: NESFA Press
- Publication date: 1984
- Publication place: United States
- Media type: Print (hardback)
- Pages: xii, 193 pp
- ISBN: 0-915368-27-7
- OCLC: 11676814
- Dewey Decimal: 813/.54 19
- LC Class: PS3554.I328 D5 1984

Dickson! is a collection of science fiction stories by American writer Gordon R. Dickson. It was first published by NESFA Press in 1984 and was issued in honor of Dickson's appearance as guest of honor at the 42nd World Science Fiction Convention. Most of the stories originally appeared in the magazines SFWA Bulletin, Astounding, Analog Science Fiction and Fact, Ellery Queen's Mystery Magazine and Science Fiction Stories. The book contains introduction to each story by Sandra Miesel.

== Contents ==
- Introduction, by Poul Anderson
- "Childe Cycle: Status 1984"
- "The Law-Twister Shorty"
- "Steel Brother"
- "The Hard Way"
- "Out of the Darkness"
- "Perfectly Adjusted"
