= Beginnings (collection) =

- Cover of the first edition
- Author: Gordon R. Dickson
- Cover artist: Greg West
- Language: English
- Genre: Science fiction
- Publisher: Baen Books
- Publication date: 1988
- Publication place: United States
- Media type: Print (paperback)
- Pages: 282
- ISBN: 0-671-65429-2
- OCLC: 18424965

Beginnings is a collection of science fiction stories and poems by American writer Gordon R. Dickson. It was first published by Baen Books in 1988. The majority of the stories had originally appeared in the magazines Astounding, Future, Analog Science Fiction and Fact, Fantastic, Fantasy and Science Fiction, Galaxy Science Fiction, Fantastic Universe and Worlds of Tomorrow. The poems had first appeared in The Final Encyclopedia.

== Contents ==
- Foreword
- "The Brown Man"
- "Danger—Human!"
- "Cloak and Stagger"
- "Three-Part Puzzle"
- "Seats of Hell"
- "Listen"
- "Soldier, Ask Not"
- "Strictly Confidential"
- "Powerway Emergency"
- "Idiot Solvant"
- "On Messenger Mountain"
