= The Cloak and the Staff =

- Short story by Gordon R. Dickson
- Genre: Science fiction novelette

Publication
- Publisher: Analog Science Fiction
- Publication date: 1980

"The Cloak and the Staff" is a science fiction novelette by American writer Gordon R. Dickson. It won the Hugo Award for Best Novelette in 1981.

== Plot summary ==
A skilled human translator tries to balance his desire to stay alive with his need to lash out at Earth's hulking overlords, who treat humans as cattle, or at best, pets.
