= Beyond the Dar Al-Harb =

- Cover of the first edition
- Author: Gordon R. Dickson
- Cover artist: Alan Gutierrez
- Language: English
- Genre: Fantasy and science fiction
- Publisher: Tor Books
- Publication date: 1985
- Publication place: United States
- Media type: Print (paperback)
- Pages: 253
- ISBN: 0-8125-3550-2
- OCLC: 12886057

Beyond the Dar Al-Harb is a collection of three fantasy and science fiction stories by American writer Gordon R. Dickson. It was first published by Tor Books in 1985. The title story is original to this collection, and features "Red Jamie", a character from the Thieves World series previously in Dickson's collaborative novel Jamie the Red (1984) (written with Roland Green). The others appeared in the magazine Worlds of Tomorrow and the anthology The Day the Sun Stood Still edited by Robert Silverberg.

Dar al-Harb is an Arabic term, meaning "house of war".

== Contents ==
- "Beyond the Dar al-Harb"
- "On Messenger Mountain"
- "Things Which Are Caesar’s"

== Sources ==
- Brown, Charles N.; William G. Contento. "The Locus Index to Science Fiction (1984-1998)".
- Clute, John; John Grant (1997). The Encyclopedia of Fantasy. New York: St. Martin's Press. p. 270. ISBN 0-88184-708-9.
- Clute, John; Peter Nicholls (1995). The Encyclopedia of Science Fiction. New York: St. Martin's Griffin. p. 332. ISBN 0-312-13486-X.
- Tryforos, Laurel Anderson (December 1985), "A Scot in Araby", Fantasy Review, 8 (12): 17, ISSN 0747-234X
- "Internet Speculative Fiction Database".
