= The Forever Man =

1986 novel by Gordon R. Dickson

First edition (publ. Ace Books)

The Forever Man is a novel by Gordon R. Dickson published in 1986.

== Plot summary ==
The Forever Man is a novel in which people can transfer their disembodied minds into spaceships.

== Reception ==
Dave Langford reviewed The Forever Man for White Dwarf #95, and stated that "Mostly it's good, solid entertainment with some thoughtful asides - though I'm never very convinced when a grim emotional impasse is transformed into a very happy boy-meets-girl ending in just a few lines of dialogue on the last page."

== Reviews ==
- Review by Dan Chow (1986) in Locus, #307 August 1986
- Review by Fernando Q. Gouvêa (1986) in Fantasy Review, October 1986
- Review by Baird Searles (1987) in Isaac Asimov's Science Fiction Magazine, January 1987
- Review by Chris Henderson (1987) in Starlog, #114 January 1987
- Review by Don D'Ammassa (1987) in Science Fiction Chronicle, #88 January 1987
- Review by Ken Lake (1987) in Vector 136
- Review by E. F. Bleiler (1987) in Rod Serling's The Twilight Zone Magazine, April 1987
- Review by Tom Easton (1987) in Analog Science Fiction/Science Fact, May 1987
