= The Right to Arm Bears =

2000 anthology by Gordon R. Dickson

- Author: Gordon R. Dickson
- Cover artist: Richard Martin
- Language: English
- Genre: Science fiction
- Publisher: Baen Books
- Publication date: December 2000
- Publication place: United States
- Media type: Print (paperback)
- Pages: 431 (paperback edition)
- ISBN: 0-671-31959-0 (paperback edition)
- OCLC: 45431591

The Right to Arm Bears is a collection of two science fiction novels and one novelette by American writer Gordon R. Dickson. They are set on the planet Dilbia, where humans and an alien race known as Hemnoids are trying to win the support of the native bear-like population.

== Plot summary ==
The planet Dilbia is in a vital spot for both human and Hemnoid space travel. Both are trying to persuade the Dilbians to work with them to use the planet as a way station.

=== Spacial Delivery ===
In the first novel (originally published in 1961) a biologist is drafted into the diplomatic corps to aid the human ambassador to Dilbia. He sends John Tardy (Half-Pint Posted) to hunt down a Dilbian, the Streamside Terror, who has kidnapped Ty Lamorc (Greasy Face), another human. While being delivered by stalwart Dilbian postman Hill Bluffer, Tardy learns more of the situation, and is attacked and eventually captured by Boy Is She Built (Streamside Terror's girlfriend) and the Hemnoid Tark-ay. Tardy gets free, and learns that things aren't quite as they seem on the planet or with the situation. As he solves the dilemma of rescuing Lamorc, he gains a victory for humanity over the Hemnoids, and a deeper insight into the Dilbians for humanity's future dealings.

Spacial Delivery is an expanded version of "The Man in the Mailbag", a novelette published in 1959 in Galaxy magazine.

=== Spacepaw ===
In Spacepaw, a novel originally published in 1969, Bill Waltham is a terraforming specialist sent to Muddy Nose village on Dilbia to teach the natives to use basic farming tools. When he arrives, the agricultural group leader and assistant are missing. The assistant, Anita Lyme, has been kidnapped by a local group of bandits led by Bone Breaker. Hill Bluffer returns as a freelance consultant to help Bill (Pick-and-Shovel) continue the Shorty tradition of overcoming tough Dilbian customers. The outlaws are holed up in a valley, and Bill discovers, upon visiting, that Anita is a "guest". The whole story is a plan by Bone Breaker to get beaten by a human, but not lose face, so that he can retire from being an outlaw.

=== "The Law-Twister Shorty" ===
In the novelette "The Law-Twister Shorty" (originally published in 1971), high school student Malcolm O'Keefe is sent in to avoid a diplomatic incident as Gentle Maiden attempts to adopt some stranded human tourists. Village law allows her to do this, and Malcolm must defeat Iron Bender in order to have them released. Instead, he is able to make new laws by moving the Stone of the Mighty Grappler.

== Characters ==
- Humans
  - Right Honorable Joshua Guy (Little Bite) - Ambassador Plenipotentiary to Dilbia
  - John Tardy (Half-Pint Posted) - Drafted assistant to Ambassador Guy, xenobiologist and former Decathlete
  - Ty Lamorc (Greasy Face) - Assistant to Ambassador Guy
  - Bill Waltham (Pick-and-Shovel) – Newly arrived Agricultural Resident trainee assistant, trained terraformer
  - Anita Lyme (Dirty Teeth) - Agricultural Resident trainee assistant
  - Malcolm O’Keefe (Mighty Law-Twister) – High school graduate
- Dilbians
  - Hill Bluffer - Postman
  - One Man – Innkeeper and local legend
  - Boy Is She Built – Girlfriend to Streamside Terror
  - Streamside Terror – Abducted Ty Lamorc
  - Sweet Thing – Wants Bone Breaker to marry her and settle down
  - Bone Breaker – Outlaw leader
  - More Jam – Innkeeper, retired wrestler, Sweet Thing’s father
  - Thing-or-Two – Wife of Tin Ear
  - Perfectly Delightful - Sweet Thing’s rival
  - Iron Bender – Gentle Maiden’s protector
  - One Punch – Candidate for "Grandfather" of Clan Water Gap
  - Gentle Maiden – Adoptive parent of human tourists
