= Mutants (short story collection) =

- Dust-jacket from the first edition
- Author: Gordon R. Dickson
- Cover artist: Anthony Sini
- Language: English
- Genre: Science fiction short stories
- Publisher: Macmillan
- Publication date: 1970
- Publication place: United States
- Media type: Print (hardback)
- Pages: v, 250 pp

Mutants is a collection of science fiction stories by Gordon R. Dickson. It was first published by Macmillan in 1970. The stories originally appeared in the magazines Astounding, Analog Science Fiction and Fact, Galaxy Science Fiction and Fantasy and Science Fiction.

== Contents ==
- Introduction
- "Warrior"
- "Of the People"
- "Danger—Human!"
- "Rehabilitated"
- "Listen"
- "Roofs of Silver"
- "By New Hearth Fires"
- "Idiot Solvant"
- "The Immortal"
- "Miss Prinks"
- "Home from the Shore"
