= Hoka! =

Collection of science fiction stories

- Cover of the first edition
- Author: Poul Anderson and Gordon Dickson
- Illustrator: Victoria Poyser, Nicola Cuti, Lela Dowling and Phil Foglio
- Cover artist: Michael Whelan
- Language: English
- Genre: Science fiction
- Publisher: Wallaby
- Publication date: 1983
- Publication place: United States
- Media type: Print (hardback)
- Pages: 253
- ISBN: 0-8125-3567-7
- OCLC: 11010283
- Preceded by: Earthman's Burden

Hoka! is a collection of science fiction stories by American writers Poul Anderson and Gordon Dickson, a sequel to Earthman's Burden. It was first published by Wallaby in 1983. The stories originally appeared in the magazines Fantasy and Science Fiction and Analog Science Fiction and Fact.

== Contents ==
- Prologue, by Poul Anderson and Gordon Dickson
- "Joy in Mudville"
- "Undiplomatic Immunity"
- "Full Pack"
- "The Napoleon Crime"
- Afterword, by Sandra Miesel

== Reception ==
In the March 1984 edition of Fantasy & Science Fiction, Algis Budrys praised the collection, saying "The whole thing is a delight and I commend it to you almost unreservedly."

In Issue 30 of Abyss (Summer 1984), Dave Nalle commented, "The stories are all quite humorous, reminiscent of Keith Laumer's Retief stories in style, though of somewhat more limited scope." Nalle especially liked the short stores "Joy in Mudville" and "The Napoleon Crime", but noted "All of the stories are well written and fun to read." Nalle concluded, "These are not groundbreaking or uplifting stories, but they are fun and constantly diverting, and original in their content and humor. I can definitely recommend Hoka to those who like light science fiction."

== Sources ==
- Bartter, Martha (June 1984), "Hokum Revisited", Fantasy Review, vol. 7, no. 5, p. 24, ISSN 0747-234X
- Clute, John; Peter Nicholls (1995). The Encyclopedia of Science Fiction. New York: St. Martin's Griffin. p. 331. ISBN 0-312-13486-X.
- Contento, William G. "Index to Science Fiction Anthologies and Collections".
- Notkin, Debbie (July 1983), "Locus Looks at More Books", Locus, vol. 16, no. 7, p. 9
- Searles, Baird (May 1984), "On Books", Isaac Asimov's Science Fiction Magazine, vol. 8, no. 5, Davis Publications, p. 174
- "Internet Speculative Fiction Database".
