= Alan Gutierrez =

Science fiction & fantasy artist & illustrator (born 1958)

External image
- Cover art for Planar's Gift, 2013

Alan Gutierrez (born 1958 in Kansas City, Missouri) is an artist and illustrator, specializing in science fiction and fantasy cover art. Gutierrez grew up in southern California, and he received his BFA in illustration from the Art Center College of Design in Pasadena in 1982. His first professional sale was to Fantasy Book in 1983. He then began painting covers for Tor Books, Baen Books and other publishers. Gutierrez has also painted covers for Analog magazine, Asimov's Science Fiction, and other SF magazines. As of mid-2014, he is credited with 156 book and magazine covers at the Internet Speculative Fiction Database. His works have been nominated for several awards.
