= The Final Encyclopedia =

1984 novel by Gordon R. Dickson

- First edition
- Author: Gordon R. Dickson
- Cover artist: Michael Whelan
- Language: English
- Series: Childe Cycle
- Genre: Science fiction
- Publisher: Tor Books
- Publication date: October 1984
- Publication place: United States
- Media type: Print (Hardcover)
- Pages: 696
- ISBN: 0-312-93241-3
- OCLC: 865335455
- Preceded by: Tactics of Mistake
- Followed by: The Chantry Guild

The Final Encyclopedia is a science fiction book by Gordon R. Dickson published in 1984. It is part of the Childe Cycle series. The Final Encyclopedia transitions from the militaristic action-adventure of the earlier books in the Childe Cycle to a philosophical commentary on the evolution of humankind.

== Plot summary ==
In the 24th century, humans have spread to multiple planets. Most planets are populated by one of the three Splinter Cultures: the Dorsai, military elite; the Exotics, arts and sciences; the Friendly, zealots of religious faith. A group called the Others, Splinter Culture cross-breeds, are gaining dominance over the outer planets.

Hal Mayne, an orphan who was discovered alone on an abandoned spaceship as a baby, is raised on Earth by three guardians, one from each Splinter Culture. One of the leaders of the Others, Bleys Ahrens, comes to the compound to find Hal. The three guardians are killed trying to protect Hal and he escapes to the Final Encyclopedia.

The Final Encyclopedia, which orbits Earth, contains all the knowledge of the human race. Hal's reaction at the Transit Point leads the director, Tam Olyn, to believe Hal could be his successor, but Hal insists on traveling on to Coby, a mining planet. After several years on Coby, Hal spends time on a Friendly planet, an Exotic planet, and the Dorsai planet, making connections and growing in self-knowledge along the way.

Meanwhile, the Others have been extending their dominance, leading the Splinter Cultures to recognize that they are under threat of destruction. Using the resources of the Final Encyclopedia and the partnerships he's built with members of the Splinter Cultures, Hal organizes the resistance to the Others on Earth. It is eventually revealed that Hal Mayne is in fact Donal Graeme, who had somehow developed the ability to reinvent himself as an infant and secure the necessary training to counteract the Others.

== Reception ==
Kirkus found it disappointing: "the ratio of chat to action worsens steadily" and "a longwinded and disappointing addition to a distinctive series".

Dave Langford reviewed The Final Encyclopedia for White Dwarf #71, and stated that "Over five novels and several shorts, this series has risen from vigorous pulp adventure to self-conscious worthiness.. . and has, alas, got less interesting."

In Analog, Susan Shwartz describes The Final Encyclopedia as "a richly textured, carefully constructed book that teems with extraordinary characters", but notes that some parts devolve into lecturing about ontogenetics, poetry, and medieval history.

In Norman Spinrad's analysis, The Final Encyclopedia lacks story, and instead varies exposition and philosophy with combat scenes, describing it as "stringing his lectures along the old action-adventure plot skeleton".

Susan Butvin, writing in Extrapolation says "Man's evolution (or transcendence) as a consequence of personal and social assimilation of knowledge, faith, creativity, responsibility, inner and outer space, various cultures within humanity, past, present, future, choice, and love marks The Final Encyclopedia as an optimistic, social science fiction novel."

Mountcastle compares The Final Encyclopedia to Alayavijnana, the "all-encompassing foundation consciousness" in Buddhism.

Bleiler notes that, with his Splinter Cultures, Dickson presents archetypical prime characters: the men of Faith, War, and Philosophy.

The Final Encyclopedia was a nominee for the 1985 Prometheus Award.
