= Call Him Lord =

- Novelette by Gordon R. Dickson
- Illustrator: Frank Kelly Freas
- Country: United States
- Language: English
- Genre: Science fiction novelette

Publication
- Published in: Analog Science Fiction and Fact
- Publication type: Periodical
- Publisher: Condé Nast
- Media type: Print (Magazine)
- Publication date: May 1966
- Pages: 19
- Award: Nebula Award for Best Novelette (1967)

"Call Him Lord" is a novelette by the American writer Gordon R. Dickson. It was first published in Analog Science Fiction and Fact in May 1966. In the story, the heir to a galactic empire tours a museum-like Earth, accompanied by a bodyguard who is a resident. Through ensuing events and conversations they judge each other.

== Story summary ==
In the far future, Earth is preserved as it was before there was a galactic empire. In Kentucky, Kyle Arnam, whose ancestors were bodyguards to the Emperor's ancestors "back in the wars of conquest against the aliens", is required to accompany the Emperor's eldest son, who is visiting Earth and traveling incognito.

The Prince is callow, arrogant and patronizing, and has little respect for Earth; he says that his tutor "belongs to the school of old men who still think your Earth is something precious and vital"; he is here only to please his father.

They ride through the countryside on horses, and find a beer garden. They have refreshments at a table near a dance floor, and the Prince insists that he should dance with the waitress who served them. A busboy, noticing his arrogant behavior, takes hold of his arm; the Prince is scandalized and attacks him. Kyle persuades the Prince to abandon the argument, and they leave.

"The only way to keep a race and culture preserved is to keep it alive," Kyle says in the bar of a roadside inn. The Earth is "a living example for the Younger Worlds to check themselves against." The Prince is more interested in the waitress. While Kyle goes out to check the horses, the Prince disappears. When he later finds him, he learns that the Prince has been in the waitress's room. Asked by Kyle why he did it, he says, "You see I've seen through you. I know whose bodyguard you are. You're theirs!"

They leave the inn and find a bar at a fishing resort. The Prince says, "I've seen you people, now. You don't outclass us, out on the Younger Worlds.... I can do what I want here, and no one on this planet is good enough to stop me. Watch." He starts to talk to the waitress, interrupting a man nearby; the man throws the Prince's beer in his face. The bartender tells them to go outside to fight.

The Prince, aware that the man would win the fight, takes Kyle's gun and backs out of the bar; Kyle follows him. The Prince refuses to give him back the gun. Kyle realizes the Prince is a coward, and has failed the actual test behind his visit - to learn if the Prince has the character to succeed the Emperor. Kyle swiftly kills the Prince with a knife to the heart and returns the body to the heartbroken Emperor, telling him that one of his other sons will instead lead the Empire.

== Reception ==
"Call Him Lord" was a finalist for the Hugo Award for Best Novelette in 1967. It won the Nebula Award for Best Novelette in 1967, and was included in Nebula Award Stories Two; in the introduction to the story, the editors wrote: "His Emperor has the ring of a true emperor, and behind him we are aware of that star-spanning empire and of the problems it must present."

The story was described, in an obituary by David Langford, as "a short, unflinching parable of power and responsibility".
