= Lost Dorsai =

1980 novella by Gordon R. Dickson

- First edition
- Author: Gordon R. Dickson
- Cover artist: Fernando Fernandez
- Genre: Science fiction
- Publisher: Ace Books
- Publication date: 1980
- Pages: 287
- ISBN: 0-441-49299-1

Lost Dorsai is a science fiction novella by American writer Gordon R. Dickson. It won the Hugo Award for Best Novella in 1981 and was also nominated for the Nebula Award in 1980.

== Plot summary ==
A few highly skilled mercenaries, the Dorsai, are stuck defending a powerless ruler whose army has revolted. To make matters worse, one of their members, the military band leader, refuses to kill. He finds a way to save his comrades, using the machismo permeating the culture of the world they are on, though the price is high.

== Reception ==
Susan Shwartz reviewed Lost Dorsai in Ares Magazine #4 and commented that "Dickson has packed an amazing amount of human pain into Lost Dorsai. It is an intense novella, and very finely crafted; each major character is drawn into each other character's pain."

Dave Langford reviewed Lost Dorsai for White Dwarf #57, and stated that "From the surprisingly satisfying resolution, which turns the enemies' machismo judo-style against them, I suspect Dickson has been reading Kipling again."

== Sources, references, external links, quotations ==
- Lost Dorsai title listing at the Internet Speculative Fiction Database
