= Sandra Miesel =

American medievalist writer

Sandra Louise Miesel (born Sandra Louise Schwartz on November 25, 1941) in New Orleans is an American medievalist, writer, editor and fiction critic. Her early work was in science fiction and fantasy criticism, while her later writings focus on religious critiques.

== Writing career ==
Miesel was a member of science fiction fandom (a connection which sprang from a letter she had published in IF magazine). She published several critical articles in the science fiction fanzine Yandro, especially on Anderson and Dickson, as well as other fanzines such as Granfalloon.

She started her career as a critic in 1970s with Myth, Symbol and Religion in The Lord of the Rings (1973 chap) on J R R Tolkien.

She was nominated for the Hugo Award for Best Fan Writer three times (1973, 1974 and 1975) and had two monographs published by Fannish small presses: Myth, Symbol and Religion in The Lord of the Rings (T-K Graphics, 1973) and Against Time's Arrow: The High Crusade of Poul Anderson (Borgo Press, 1978).

Miesel has written many articles for the Catholic press, chiefly focusing on history, art, and hagiography. She wrote regularly for the Crisis Catholic magazine and is a columnist for the diocesan paper of the Diocese of Norwich, Connecticut.

Miesel is also a public speaker, having spoken at religious and academic conferences, appeared on EWTN, and given numerous radio interviews.

== Highlighted works ==
Miesel has co-authored, The Da Vinci Hoax: Exposing the Errors in The Da Vinci Code, with Carl E. Olson. This is a detailed critique of the popular novel based on her knowledge of Catholic history and teachings.

She is also the co-author of The Pied Piper of Atheism: Philip Pullman and Children's Fantasy with Catholic journalist and canon lawyer Pete Vere. The book, published by Ignatius Press, offers a detailed critique of Philip Pullman's His Dark Materials trilogy from a Catholic point of view.

== Personal life ==
Miesel holds master's degrees in biochemistry and medieval history from the University of Illinois. She lives in the Indianapolis, Indiana area. She was married to John Miesel for 42 years until his death in 2006.

== Selected works ==
=== Fiction ===
- Miesel, Sandra (1989). Shaman. Baen. ISBN 0-671-69844-3. Speculative fiction. An earlier version was published as Dreamrider (Ace Books, 1982).

=== Non-fiction ===
- Miesel, Sandra (1973). Myth, Symbol, and Religion in The Lord of the Rings. T-K Graphics. OCLC: 1242807.
- Miesel, Sandra (1978). Against Time's Arrow: The High Crusade of Poul Anderson. Borgo Press. ISBN 0-89370-124-6.
- "The Fan As Critic" in Science fiction fandom Joe Sanders, ed. (Contributions to the study of science fiction and fantasy, no. 62) Westport, Conn.: Greenwood Press, 1994. ISBN 0-313-23380-2
- Olson, Carl E.; Sandra Miesel (2004). The Da Vinci Hoax: Exposing the Errors in The Da Vinci Code. Ignatius Press. ISBN 1-58617-034-1.
