= Gordon R. Dickson =

American science fiction writer (1923–2001)

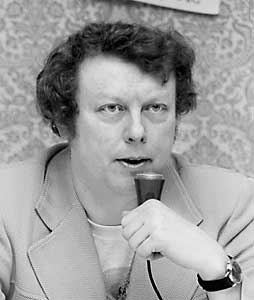
- Dickson lecturing at Minicon in 1974
- Born: Gordon Rupert Dickson; November 1, 1923; Edmonton, Alberta, Canada
- Died: January 31, 2001 (aged 77); Minneapolis, U.S.
- Occupation: Writer
- Writing career
- Period: 1950–2001
- Genres: Science fiction, fantasy
- Notable work: Childe Cycle

Gordon Rupert Dickson (November 1, 1923 – January 31, 2001) was an American science fiction writer. He was inducted into the Science Fiction and Fantasy Hall of Fame in 2000.

== Biography ==
Dickson was born in Edmonton, Alberta, in 1923. After the death of his father, he moved with his mother to Minneapolis in 1937. He served in the United States Army, from 1943 to 1946, and received a Bachelor of Arts from the University of Minnesota, in 1948. From 1948 through 1950 he attended the University of Minnesota for graduate work. His first published speculative fiction was the short story "Trespass!", written jointly with Poul Anderson, in the Spring 1950 issue of Fantastic Stories Quarterly (ed. Sam Merwin), the inaugural number of Fantastic Story Magazine as it came to be titled. Next year three of his solo efforts were published by John W. Campbell in Astounding Science Fiction and one appeared in Planet Stories. Anderson and Dickson also inaugurated the Hoka series with "The Sheriff of Canyon Gulch" (Other Worlds Science Stories, May 1951).

Dickson's series of novels include the Childe Cycle (sometimes called the Dorsai series) and the Dragon Knight. He won three Hugo Awards and one Nebula Award.

For a great part of his life, he suffered from the effects of asthma. He died of complications from severe asthma.

== Personality ==
John Clute has characterized Dickson as a "gregarious, engaging, genial, successful man of letters" who had not been an introvert. Clute considers Dickson a "science fiction romantic". Nevertheless, Clute stresses in connection to Dickson that science fiction welcomes "images of heightened solitude, romantically vague, limitless landscapes, and an anguished submission to afflatus", due to its origin in Gothic fiction.

== Style ==
Clute has pointed out that Dickson, like Poul Anderson, with whom he collaborated in the Hoka series, "[tends] to infuse an austere Nordic pathos into wooded, rural midwestern American settings." His works often have mercenaries as their protagonists and deal with aliens that are "less deracinated and more lovable than humans". They "are inclined to take on a heightened, sagalike complexion", particularly by the insertion of lyric poetry that is sometimes inferior.

== Archival materials ==
In 1974, Dickson donated to the Manuscripts Division of the University of Minnesota Libraries notes, outlines, and drafts for more than 240 short stories and 36 novels and novelettes. These included materials for Alien Art, The Outposter, The Pritcher Mass, None But Man, and Soldier Ask Not. They were made available to researchers without restriction.

== Awards ==
Dickson received the 1977 Skylark (Edward E. Smith Memorial Award for Imaginative Fiction) from NESFA for his contribution to SF, and he was inducted by the Science Fiction and Fantasy Hall of Fame in 2000.

He won several annual literary awards for particular works.

Hugo Award

- "Soldier, Ask Not" for best short story, 1965
- "Lost Dorsai" for best novella, 1981
- "The Cloak and the Staff" for best novelette, 1981

Nebula Award

- "Call Him Lord" for best novelette, 1966

August Derleth Award (best novel, British Fantasy Society)

- The Dragon and the George, 1977

== Selected works ==
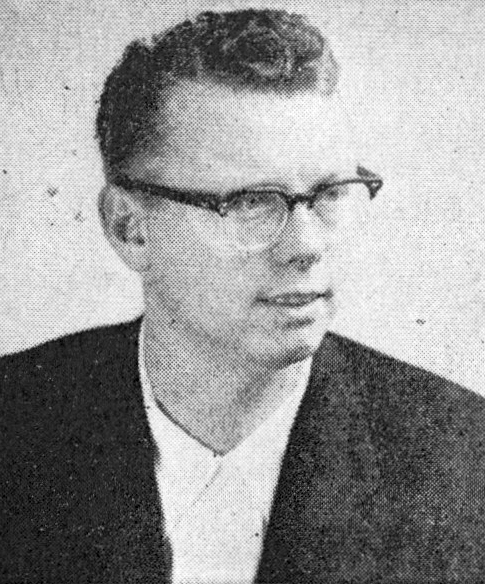
Gordon Dickson c.1955

=== Childe Cycle ===
- Dorsai! (1959; variant title: The Genetic General)
- Necromancer (1962; variant title: No Room for Man)
- Soldier, Ask Not (1967)
- Tactics of Mistake (1971)
- The Spirit of Dorsai (1979)
- Lost Dorsai (1980)
- The Final Encyclopedia (1984)
- The Dorsai Companion (1986)
- The Chantry Guild (1988)
- Young Bleys (1991)
- Other (1994)
- Antagonist (2007; with David W. Wixon)

=== Dragon Knight series ===
1. The Dragon and the George (1976)
2. The Dragon Knight (1990)
3. The Dragon on the Border (1992)
4. The Dragon at War (1992)
5. The Dragon, the Earl, and the Troll (1994)
6. The Dragon and the Djinn (1996)
7. The Dragon and the Gnarly King (1997)
8. The Dragon in Lyonesse (1998)
9. The Dragon and the Fair Maid of Kent (2000)

=== Hoka series (with Poul Anderson) ===
- Earthman's Burden (1957; collection of stories published 1951 to 1956)
- Hoka! (1983)
- Star Prince Charlie (1983)
- Hoka! Hoka! Hoka! (1998; expanded version of Earthman's Burden)
- Hokas Pokas! (2000; collection, including Star Prince Charlie)

=== Novels ===
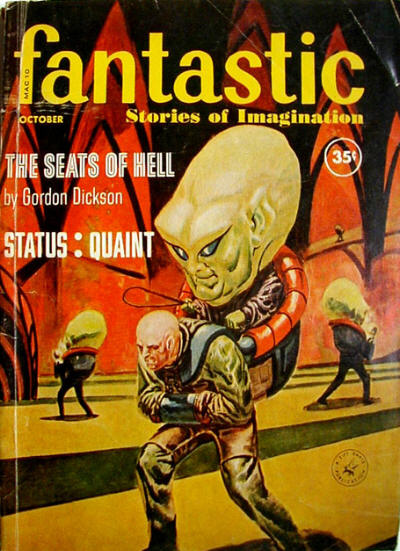
Dickson's novelette "The Seats of Hell", cover-featured on the May 1959 issue of Fantastic, was collected in Beginnings

- Alien from Arcturus (1956; expanded as Arcturus Landing)
- Mankind on the Run (1956; variant title: On the Run, 1979)
- Time to Teleport (1960)
- Naked to the Stars (1961)
- Spacial Delivery (1961)
- Delusion World (1961)
- The Alien Way (1965)
- Space Winners (1965)
- Mission to Universe (1965; rev. 1977)
- The Space Swimmers (1967)
- Planet Run (1967; with Keith Laumer)
- Spacepaw (1969)
- Wolfling (1969)
- None But Man (1969)
- Hour of the Horde (1970)
- Sleepwalkers’ World (1971)
- The Outposter (1972)
- The Pritcher Mass (1972)
- Alien Art (1973)
- The R-Master (1973; revised as The Last Master, 1984)
- Gremlins, Go Home (1974) (with Ben Bova)
- The Lifeship (variant title: Lifeboat) (1977; with Harry Harrison)
- Time Storm (1977)
- The Far Call (1978)
- Home from the Shore (1978)
- Pro (1978; illustrated by James R. Odbert) (Ace Illustrated Novel)
- Masters of Everon (1980)
- The Last Master (1984)
- Jamie the Red (1984; with Roland Green)
- The Forever Man (1986)
- Way of the Pilgrim (1987)
- The Earth Lords (1989)
- Wolf and Iron (1990)
- The Magnificent Wilf (1995)
- The Right to Arm Bears (2000; omnibus of Spacial Delivery, Spacepaw, "The Law-Twister Shorty")

=== Short story collections ===
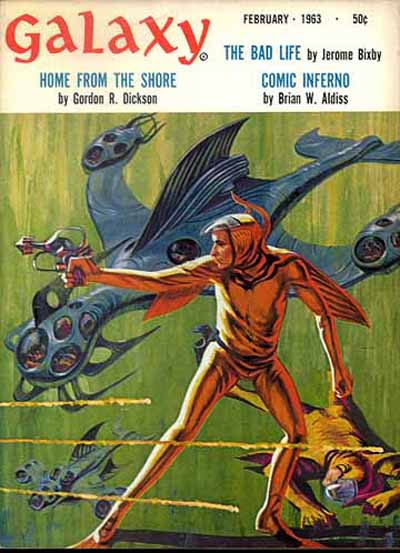
Dickson's novelette "Home from the Shore", cover-featured on the February 1963 issue of Galaxy Science Fiction, was collected in Mutants

- Danger—Human (1970; as The Book of Gordon Dickson, 1973)
- Mutants (1970)
- The Star Road (1973)
- Ancient, My Enemy (1974)
- Gordon R. Dickson's SF Best (1978; revised as In the Bone, 1987)
- In Iron Years (1980)
- Love Not Human (1981)
- The Man from Earth (1983)
- Dickson! (1984; revised as Steel Brother {1985})
- Survival! (1984)
- Forward! (1985)
- Beyond the Dar Al-Harb (1985)
- Invaders! (1985)
- Steel Brother (1985)
- The Man the Worlds Rejected (1986)
- Mindspan (1986)
- The Last Dream (1986)
- The Stranger (1987)
- Guided Tour (1988)
- Beginnings (1988)
- Ends (1988)
- The Human Edge (2003)

=== Children's books ===
- Secret Under the Sea (1960)
- Secret Under Antarctica (1963)
- Secret Under the Caribbean (1964)
- Secrets of the Deep (1985; omnibus of the three above works)
