= Old MacDonald Had A Curve =

1953 film by Harry Hermann

Old MacDonald Had A Curve was a live television play written by Rod Serling that aired August 5, 1953 as part of the Kraft Television Theatre series. It was one of Serling's early teleplays (a group that also included Requiem for a Heavyweight and Patterns), and is one few comedies he ever sold to television. The play starred Olin Howland and Jack Warden and was directed by Harry Hermann.

== Plot ==
Old MacDonald Had a Curve tells the tale of an ambitious ex-major-leaguer, Maxwell “Mac” MacDonald. MacDonald was a pitcher for the Brooklyn Nationals before World War I (then nicknamed "Firebrand Lefty" MacDonald), but is currently living in the Carterville Home for the Aged. Mac, who constantly exaggerates his past glories, is determined to play ball again, and refuses to die slowly in the nursing home. Meanwhile, the current Nationals manager, Mouth McGarry, the publicist, Resnick, and the owner, Bertram Beasley all debate what is to be done about the ten-game losing streak their team is stuck in. They decide they need a pitcher, a good pitcher who can win a few games for the team. Back at the nursing home, Mac dislocates his shoulder during a game of horseshoes, and suddenly he is able to throw any object at a curve of 360°. With dreams of his past fame and glory, and a newfound curve ball, Mac decides to try out for his old team. Mouth, a typical hot-head manager, gives the old man a tryout begrudgingly, but fails to pay attention as Mac strikes out their best hitters. When his younger players tell Mouth what happened, the Nationals scramble to sign the sixty-seven-year-old man. They decide that even if he can’t run the bases, he will at least strike out any batter at the plate.

With a media blitz, Mac is signed to the team, and the spectacle of the old man warming up is enough to draw a crowd. Though Mac is never used on the field, the team starts to pull itself out of its funk and win some games. When the Commissioner orders McGarry to put Mac in a game or let him go, Old MacDonald finally takes the mound. However, poor Mac tosses the rosin bag a little too hard and ends up popping his shoulder back into place. His first pitch barely makes the plate.

When Mac returns to the home, he is depressed. He feels like he has let everyone down, but really, he has been an inspiration to his fellow residents. Mac gives all the money he earned with the deal to the Center for the Aged, content with having used to be Firebrand Lefty MacDonald. Until he dislocates his shoulder again, and gets his curve back.
