= Patterns (Kraft Television Theatre) =

- Kraft Television Theatre episode
- Ed Begley, Everett Sloane and Richard Kiley in "Patterns" [photograph by Lawrence Fried]
- Episode no.: Season 8 Episode 16
- Directed by: Fielder Cook
- Written by: Rod Serling
- Original air date: January 12, 1955

Guest appearances
- Everett Sloane as Mr. Ramsie; Richard Kiley as Fred Staples; Ed Begley as Andy Sloane

Episode chronology
← Previous "One Hill, One River"	Next → "The Written Word"

"Patterns" was an American television play broadcast live on January 12, 1955, as part of the NBC television series, Kraft Television Theatre. Because of its popularity, it was restaged on February 9, 1955.

It was written by Rod Serling and directed by Fielder Cook. Everett Sloane, Richard Kiley, and Ed Begley starred.

== Summary ==
Ruthless corporate boss Walter Ramsie (played by Everett Sloane; called Ramsey in the film adaptation) attempts to edge out aging employee Andy Sloane (played by Ed Begley) to make room for newcomer Fred Staples (played by Richard Kiley). Ramsie uses every opportunity to humiliate the fragile Sloane, while Staples sees Sloane as a professional who makes valuable contributions to the firm. After a dramatic boardroom argument with Ramsie, Sloane collapses from a heart attack and dies. Staples tenders his resignation, but is convinced by Ramsie to stay in the play's climactic confrontation scene.

== Cast ==
The cast consisted of the following:

- Everett Sloane as Mr. Ramsie
- Richard Kiley as Fred Staples
- Ed Begley as Andy Sloane
- June Dayton as Fran Staples
- Joanna Roos as Miss Lanier
- Elizabeth Montgomery as Ann Evans
- Elizabeth Wilson as Marge Fleming
- Jack Arthur as Starter
- Victoria Ward as Miss Stevens
- Sybil Baker as Telephone Operator
- Shirley Standlee as Miss Hill
- Theodore Newton as Mr. Gordon
- Jack Livesey as Mr. Jamieson
- Ronnie Welsh as Paul Sloane
- Tom Charles
- Ron Harper
- Victor Harrison
- Helen Ludlom
- Joseph Mac Cauley
- Al Morgen
- Douglas Rutherford
- Chuck Wallace

== Reception ==
Serling's celebrated script tore apart the dynamics of the business world and earned Serling his first of six Emmys for dramatic writing. There was a rave review from Jack Gould of The New York Times who suggested it be repeated:

Nothing in months has excited the television industry as much as the Kraft Television Theatre's production of Patterns, an original play by Rod Serling. The enthusiasm is justified. In writing, acting and direction, Patterns will stand as one of the high points in the TV medium's evolution. Patterns is a play with one point of view toward the fiercely competitive world of big business and is bound to be compared with the current motion picture Executive Suite. By comparison, Executive Suite might be Babes in Toyland without a score. For sheer power of narrative, forcefulness of characterization and brilliant climax, Mr. Serling's work is a creative triumph that can stand on its own. In one of those inspired moments that make the theater the wonder that it is, Patterns was an evening that belonged to the many, not only to Mr. Serling. The performances of Everett Sloane, Ed Begley and Richard Kiley were truly superb. The production and direction of Fielder Cook constituted a fluid use of video's artistic tools that underscore how little the TV artistic horizons really have been explored. Patterns was seen from 9 to 10pm Wednesday over the National Broadcasting Company's network; a repeat performance at an early date should be mandatory.

Begley's performance earned him a nomination for a Primetime Emmy Award for Best Actor in a Supporting Role.

Gould's request for a repeat was an unusual suggestion, since in that pre-videotape era, live shows were not repeated. Surprisingly, NBC took Gould's suggestion seriously and made plans for another production.

== Second live performance ==

When Patterns returned on February 9, 1955, it was once again performed live, an unprecedented event. This was the first time a television drama was repeated due to popularity. The second performance, directly sustained by Kraft Foods' advertising agency, J. Walter Thompson, was captured on kinescope and is available for viewing at The Paley Center for Media in New York City and Los Angeles.

On March 27, 1956, a feature-length film version of Patterns was released. The film featured an expanded script by Serling. Van Heflin replaced Kiley in the role of Fred Staples. In the April 27, 2008, edition of TV Week, the television critic Tom Shales compared the movie unfavorably to the live TV production:

Some people thought live TV was the beginning of a truly new storytelling medium—one uniquely suited to intimate, unadorned, psychological dramas—but it turned out to be a beginning with a tiny middle and a rushed end... Patterns was so well-received that Kraft mounted a live repeat of the show a month later, and the intimate TV show was turned into a less intimate (and somehow less satisfying) movie in 1956. Except for the use of terms like “mimeographed” and “teletype,” little about the drama seems dated, unless one is of the opinion that corporate politics and boardroom bloodletting no longer exist... With minimally judicious scene-setting (shots of clocks, a building directory, a switchboard) and a rapid introduction of characters, Serling pulls a viewer almost immediately into his story, a tale of corporate morality—or the lack of it—and such everyday battles as the ones waged between conscience and ambition.
