= Elizabeth Wilson =

American actress (1921–2015)

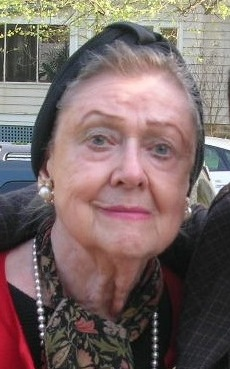
- Wilson in 2011
- Born: Elizabeth Welter Wilson; April 4, 1921; Grand Rapids, Michigan, U.S.
- Died: May 9, 2015 (aged 94); New Haven, Connecticut, U.S.
- Occupation: Actress
- Years active: 1953–2012

Elizabeth Welter Wilson (April 4, 1921 – May 9, 2015) was an American actress whose career spanned nearly 60 years in film and television. In 1972 she won the Tony Award for Best Featured Actress in a Play for her role in Sticks and Bones. Wilson was also a Primetime Emmy Award and BAFTA Award nominee, and was inducted into the American Theater Hall of Fame in 2006.

== Early life ==
Wilson was born in Grand Rapids, Michigan, the daughter of insurance agent Henry Dunning Wilson and Marie Ethel (née Welter) Wilson. Her maternal grandfather was a wealthy German immigrant, and Wilson was raised in a large mansion. She attended the Barter Theatre in Abingdon, Virginia, and then studied with Sanford Meisner at The Neighborhood Playhouse School of the Theatre in New York City.

== Career ==
Wilson was a versatile character actress, appearing in over 30 movies and many Broadway plays. The Los Angeles Times noted: "Tall and elegant, Wilson often played women who had or sought authority."

Wilson made her Broadway debut in Picnic in 1953. Her stage credits include Desk Set (1955), The Good Woman of Szechuan (1970), Sticks and Bones (1972), Uncle Vanya (1973), Threepenny Opera (1976), The Importance of Being Earnest (1977), Morning's at Seven (1980), You Can't Take It with You (1983), Ah, Wilderness! (1988), and A Delicate Balance (1996).

Following an uncredited appearance in Notorious (1946), Wilson played Marge Fleming in Rod Serling's "Patterns" for the Kraft Television Theatre and its subsequent film adaptation. She also reprised her stage role in the 1955 film adaptation of Picnic as Christine Schoenwalder. Additional films include The Goddess (1958), The Tunnel of Love (1958), A Child Is Waiting (1963, The Birds (1963), The Graduate (1967), Jenny (1970), Catch-22 (1970) Little Murders (1971), The Day of the Dolphin (1973), Man on a Swing (1974), The Prisoner of Second Avenue (1975), 9 to 5 (1980), Grace Quigley (1984), Regarding Henry (1991), The Addams Family (1991), and Quiz Show (1994). Her last film role was as Sara Delano Roosevelt in Hyde Park on Hudson (2012).

Wilson's television credits include early anthology series such as Kraft Television Theatre, The United States Steel Hour, and Armstrong Circle Theatre. She was a regular on the primetime drama East Side/West Side and the sitcom Doc, and appeared in Dark Shadows, The Secret Storm, Another World, All in the Family, Murder, She Wrote, and Law & Order: Criminal Intent. She also appeared in television movies, including The Boys Next Door (1996). She appeared in the miniseries Nutcracker: Money, Madness and Murder in March 1987 as the mother of Frances Schreuder (played by Lee Remick), as well as the miniseries Alex Haley's Queen.

== Death ==
On May 9, 2015, at age 94, Wilson died at her home in New Haven, Connecticut. She is buried at Oak Hill Cemetery in Grand Rapids, Michigan, with her parents. She never married or had children.

== Filmography ==
=== Film ===
Year	Title	Role	Notes
1955	Picnic	Christine Schoenwalder	
1956	Patterns	Marge Fleming	
1958	The Goddess	Harding	
1958	The Tunnel of Love	Miss MacCracken	
1959	Happy Anniversary	Millie	
1963	A Child Is Waiting	Miss Fogarty	
1963	The Birds	Helen Carter	
1967	The Graduate	Mrs. Braddock	
1970	Jenny	Mrs. Marsh	
1971	Little Murders	Marjorie Newquist	
1973	The Day of the Dolphin	Mrs. Rome	
1974	Man on a Swing	Dr. Anna Willson	
1975	The Prisoner of Second Avenue	Pauline	
1975	The Happy Hooker	Mrs. Gordon	
1980	9 to 5	Roz	
1981	The Incredible Shrinking Woman	Dr. Ruth Ruth	
1984	Grace Quigley	Emily Watkins	
1986	Where Are the Children?	Dorothy Prentiss	
1987	The Believers	Kate Maslow	
1989	Nora's Christmas Gift	Madeline Mumford	Video
1991	Regarding Henry	Jessica	
1991	The Addams Family	Abigail Craven / Dr. Greta Pinder-Schloss	
1994	Quiz Show	Dorothy Van Doren	
1994	Nobody's Fool	Nora	
2001	Rocky Road	Grandma Louise	
2012	Hyde Park on Hudson	Sara Roosevelt	

=== Television ===
Year	Title	Role	Notes
1954, 1959–60	The United States Steel Hour	Mrs. Watson, Grace Ferguson, Cora Wylie	Episodes: "Welcome Home", "The Pink Burro", "Queen of the Orange Bowl"
1955	Kraft Television Theatre	Marge Fleming	Episode: "Patterns"
1956	Star Tonight	Ma Kirby	Episode: "Happy Journey"
1960	Interpol Calling	Michele	Episode: "The Girl with Grey Hair"
1960	The Detectives	Beatrice Faustina	Episode: "Song of Songs"
1961	Armstrong Circle Theatre	Esther Harding	Episode: "Black Market Babies"
1963–1964	East Side/West Side	Frieda Hechlinger	Main role
1965	The Nurses	Dr. Lanz	Episode: "Sixteen Hours to Chicago"
1966	Dark Shadows	Mrs. Hopewell	Episodes: "1.1", "1.8"
1969	NET Playhouse	Miss Moray	Episode: "Let Me Hear You Whisper"
1970	The Secret Storm	Felicia Stringer	TV series
1974	Another April	Ruth Weston	TV film
1975	Miles to Go Before I Sleep	Kate Stanton	TV film
1975	All in the Family	Amelia DeKuyper	Episode: "Amelia's Divorce"
1975	The Easter Promise	Mrs. Coyle	TV film
1975–1976	Doc	Annie Bogert	Main role (season 1)
1979	Another World	Ethel Banta	Episode: "1.3746"
1979	Sanctuary of Fear	Mrs. Glidden	TV film
1980	Once Upon a Family	Norma Solomon	TV film
1982	Million Dollar Infield	Sally Ephron	TV film
1982	Tucker's Witch	Jewel Porter	Episode: "Big Mouth"
1982	Morning's at Seven	Aaronetta Gibbs	TV film
1984	Great Performances	Penny Sycamore	Episode: "You Can't Take It with You"
1986	Morningstar/Eveningstar	Kathy Kelly	TV series, 7 episodes
1987	Nutcracker: Money, Madness and Murder	Berenice Bradshaw	TV miniseries
1987	A Conspiracy of Love	Lilly Woldarski	TV film
1990	Burning Bridges	Freda	TV film
1993	Skylark	Harriet Wheaton	TV film
1993	Delta	Rosiland Dupree	Episodes: "Mom Comes to Town", "Amateur Night", "Red Hot Mama", "Delta's Little Dilemma"
1994	In the Best of Families: Marriage, Pride & Madness	Annie Klenner	TV film
1994	Spring Awakening	Mrs. Pierson	TV film
1994	Scarlett	Eulalie Robillard	TV miniseries
1995	Murder, She Wrote	Serena Haynes	Episode: "Home Care"
1996	The Boys Next Door	Mary Fremus	TV film
1996	Special Report: Journey to Mars	President Elizabeth Richardson	TV film
1997	Dellaventura	Eloise Berg	Episode: "Clean Slate"
1998	Promised Land	Evelyn Hooper	Episode: "Recycled"
2000	Gideon's Crossing	Camellia Kellogg	Episode: "Father Knows Best"
2002	Law & Order: Criminal Intent	Lucille Mobray	Episode: "Chinoiserie"

=== Stage ===
Year	Title	Role	Notes
1953	Picnic	Christine Schoenwalder	Music Box Theatre, Broadway
1955	The Desk Set	Miss Warriner	Broadhurst Theatre, Broadway
1957	The Tunnel of Love	Miss McCracken	Royale Theatre, Broadway
1961	Big Fish, Little Fish	Hilda Rose	Anta Theatre, Broadway
1967	The Little Foxes	Birdie Hubbard (Standby)/Regina Giddens (Standby)	Ethel Barrymore Theatre, Broadway
1968	Plaza Suite	Karen Nash (Standby)/Muriel Tate (Standby)/Norma Hubley (Standby)	Plymouth Theatre, Broadway
1970	The Good Woman of Setzuan	Mrs. Shin	Vivian Beaumont Theater, Broadway
1970	Sheep on the Runway	Martha Wilkins	Second Stage Theater, Off-Broadway
1972	Sticks and Bones	Harriet	John Golden Theatre, Broadway
1972	The Secret Affairs of Mildred Wild	Helen Wild	Ambassador Theatre, Broadway
1973	Uncle Vanya	Sofya Alexandrovna	Circle in the Square Theatre, Broadway
1976	The Threepenny Opera	Mrs Peachum	Vivian Beaumont Theater, Broadway
1977	The Importance of Being Earnest	Lady Bracknell	Circle in the Square Theatre, Broadway
1978	All's Well That Ends Well	Countess of Rousillon	Shakespeare in the Park, Off-Broadway
1979	Taken in Marriage	Aunt Helen	The Public Theater, Off-Broadway
1980	Morning's at Seven	Aaronetta Gibbs	Lyceum Theatre, Broadway
1983	You Can't Take It with You	Penelope Sycamore (Replacement)	Plymouth Theatre, Broadway
1985	Salonika	Enid	The Public Theater, Off-Broadway
1988	Ah, Wilderness!	Lily Miller	Neil Simon Theatre, Broadway
1996	A Delicate Balance	Edna	Plymouth Theatre, Broadway
1999	Tongue of a Bird	Zofia	The Public Theater, Off-Broadway
1999	Waiting in the Wings	Bonita Belgrave	Walter Kerr Theatre, Broadway

== Awards and nominations ==
Year	Award	Category	Nominated work	Results	Ref.
1956	British Academy Film Awards	Most Promising Newcomer to Film	Patterns	Nominated	
1976	Drama Desk Awards	Outstanding Actress in a Musical	The Threepenny Opera	Nominated	
1980	Drama Desk Awards	Outstanding Ensemble Performance	Morning's at Seven	Won	
1985	Drama Desk Awards	Outstanding Actress in a Play	Salonika	Nominated	
1987	Primetime Emmy Awards	Outstanding Supporting Actress in a Miniseries or a Special	Nutcracker: Money, Madness and Murder	Nominated	
1972	Tony Awards	Best Supporting or Featured Actress in a Play	Sticks and Bones	Won	
