= Patterns (film) =

1956 film by Fielder Cook

- Theatrical release poster
- Directed by: Fielder Cook
- Screenplay by: Rod Serling
- Story by: Rod Serling
- Produced by: Michael Myerberg; Jed Harris (uncredited)
- Starring: Van Heflin; Everett Sloane; Ed Begley; Beatrice Straight; Elizabeth Wilson
- Cinematography: Boris Kaufman
- Edited by: Dave Kummins; Carl Lerner
- Production companies: Jed Harris; Michael Myerberg
- Distributed by: United Artists
- Release date: March 27, 1956 (New York City)
- Running time: 84 minutes
- Country: United States
- Language: English

Patterns (sometimes referred to as Patterns of Power) is a 1956 American "boardroom drama" film directed by Fielder Cook, and starring Van Heflin, Everett Sloane, Ed Begley, Beatrice Straight, and Elizabeth Wilson. The screenplay was adapted by Rod Serling from his 1955 teleplay of the same name, which was originally broadcast January 12, 1955, on the Kraft Television Theatre with several of the same actors (including Sloane, Begley, and Wilson), though Richard Kiley, who had played the lead role of Fred Staples in the TV version, was replaced by Heflin for the film. Wilson's performance in the 1956 theatrical release earned her a nomination for a BAFTA Award for Most Promising Newcomer to Film.

== Plot ==
Walter Ramsey, the ruthless head of Ramsey & Company, a Manhattan-based industrial corporation inherited from his father, recruits Fred Staples, a young industrial engineer whose work at an Ohio factory has impressed him, for a senior position at company headquarters. Though Staples is initially unaware, Ramsey is grooming him to replace the aging Bill Briggs as the second-in-command at the company.

Briggs has been with the firm for forty years, having worked for and admired the company's founder, Ramsey's father. He cares greatly about his work, regularly prioritizing it above spending time with his teenage son, but his concern for people clashes repeatedly with Ramsey's heartless "modern" approach to business. Not wanting to fire Briggs outright, Ramsey, instead, does everything in his power to sabotage and humiliate Briggs into resigning. The old man stubbornly refuses to give in, but the stress gets to him, and he starts to drink, which does not help his already-deteriorating health. Staples is torn by the messy situation, his sympathy for Briggs in conflict with his ambition, which is supported by his wife.

At a board meeting, while discussing a report Briggs and Staples wrote together, Ramsey praises Staples for making Briggs' old, well-intentioned, but unworkable, ideas practical, and there is a heated exchange. Shortly after leaving the room, Briggs collapses, and he soon dies in the hospital.

Fed up, Staples goes to tell Ramsey off and announce he is quitting. Ramsey rebukes him, asserting that a corporation like Ramsey & Company needs men with their talent in order to succeed. He offers Briggs' job to Staples at double his present salary, double his stock options, and an unlimited expense account, but Staples resists. Undeterred, Ramsey increases the fever of his pitch, adding that Staples will never be able to reach his full potential anywhere else. When Staples counters that he hates Ramsey and would not be Ramsey's whipping boy, but would constantly argue and fight and try to take the presidency for himself, Ramsey, seemingly energized by someone who can work at his level and challenge him, says he is willing to continue under these conditions. Staples leaves and tells his wife that he is staying on, as that way there is at least a chance he can influence things for the better.

== Cast ==
- Van Heflin as Fred Staples, a new executive at Ramsey & Company
- Everett Sloane as Walter J. Ramsey, Ramsey & Co.'s president
- Ed Begley as William "Bill" Briggs, Ramsey & Co.'s vice president
- Beatrice Straight as Nancy Staples, Fred's wife
- Elizabeth Wilson as Marge Fleming, Briggs' loyal secretary, who is reassigned to Staples
- Joanna Roos as Margaret Lanier, Ramsey's secretary
- Valerie Cossart as Martha Stevens, secretary at the front desk of Ramsey & Co.'s executive offices
- Eleni Kiamos as Sylvia Trammel, Briggs' new secretary
- Ronnie Welsh as Paul Briggs, Bill's teenage son
- Shirley Standlee as Miss Hill, a secretary
- Andrew Duggan as Harvey Jameson, Ramsey & Co.'s head of purchasing
- Jack Livesey as D.J. Vandeventer, Ramsey & Co.'s chief engineer
- John Seymour as Edward Gordon, Ramsey & Co.'s head of sales
- James Kelly as James G. Latham, Ramsey & Co.'s head of service
- John Shelly as Edgar Grannigan, Ramsey & Co.'s controller
- Victor Harrison as Carl L. Portier, Ramsey & Co.'s chief of operations
- Sally Gracie as Ann, a secretary
- Sally Chamberlin as Mrs. Jameson, Harvey's wife
- Edward Binns as the elevator starter

== Reception ==
=== Critical response ===
In a 2002 review on Ozus' World Movie Reviews, film critic Dennis Schwartz gave the film an "A" grade and highly praised it, writing:

"Patterns is based on the teleplay of Rod Serling which was aired live on TV in January of 1955 on Kraft Television Theatre, and was so-well received that it was repeated four weeks later. That was something not done during that period. This brilliant script by the creator of the Twilight Zone, Rod Serling, is considered by many as the finest piece of writing he has ever done and brought him instant acclaim. It is ably directed by Fielder Cook [...] The ensemble cast is superb, with special kudos to Van Heflin, Ed Begley, Beatrice Straight and Everett Sloane. This is Van Heflin's finest role since Shane (1953)."

Added Schwartz:

"It's a forceful melodrama, that takes the viewer into the pits of a big corporation's board room politics, backstabbing, and the tough way of doing business. Things have changed since the 1950s which make some things outdated, but the film still has its finger on the savage nature of the business world. Even when a company is not as corrupt as an Enron, people are still perceived as secondary to making a profit no matter what."

In the April 27, 2008, edition of TVWeek, the television critic Tom Shales compared the movie unfavorably to the live TV production:

Some people thought live TV was the beginning of a truly new storytelling medium—one uniquely suited to intimate, unadorned, psychological dramas—but it turned out to be a beginning with a tiny middle and a rushed end. [...] Patterns was so well-received that Kraft mounted a live repeat of the show a month later, and the intimate TV show was turned into a less intimate (and somehow less satisfying) movie in 1956. Except for the use of terms like "mimeographed" and "teletype," little about the drama seems dated, unless one is of the opinion that corporate politics and boardroom bloodletting no longer exist. [...] With minimally judicious scene-setting (shots of clocks, a building directory, a switchboard) and a rapid introduction of characters, Serling pulls a viewer almost immediately into his story, a tale of corporate morality—or the lack of it—and such everyday battles as the ones waged between conscience and ambition.

== See also ==
- List of American films of 1956
