= Ed Begley =

American actor (1901–1970)

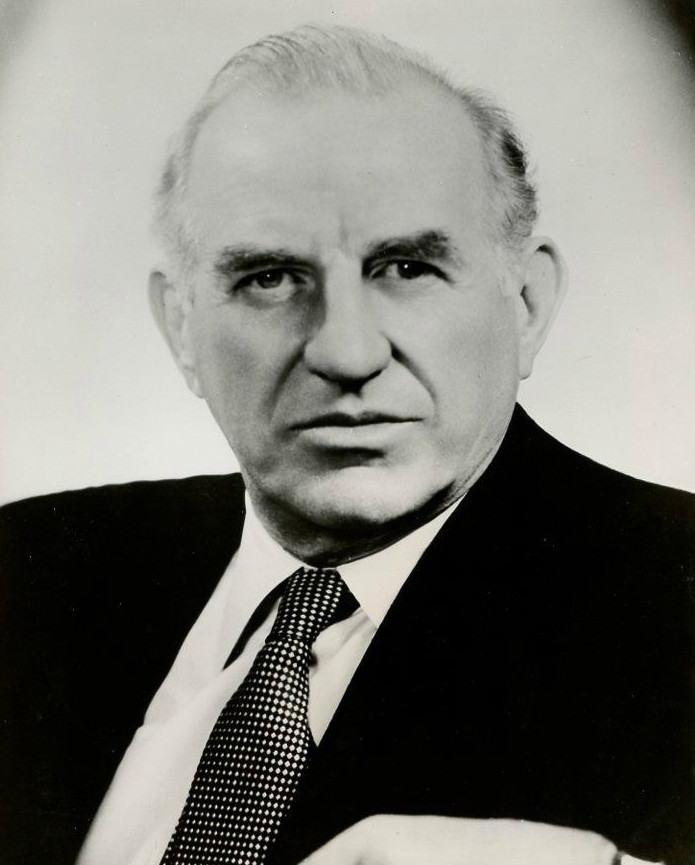
- Begley in 1958
- Born: Edward James Begley; March 25, 1901; Hartford, Connecticut, U.S.
- Died: April 28, 1970 (aged 69); Los Angeles, California, U.S.
- Resting place: San Fernando Mission Cemetery in Los Angeles, California
- Occupation: Actor
- Years active: 1917–1970
- Spouses: Amanda Huff (m. 1922; died 1957) Dorothy Reeves (m. 1961; div. 1963) Helen Jordan (m. 1963)
- Children: 3, including Ed Jr.
- Military career
- Allegiance: United States
- Branch: United States Navy

Edward James Begley Sr. (March 25, 1901 – April 28, 1970) was an American actor of theatre, radio, film, and television. He won an Academy Award for Best Supporting Actor for his performance in the film Sweet Bird of Youth (1962) and appeared in such classics as 12 Angry Men (1957), Odds Against Tomorrow (1959) and The Unsinkable Molly Brown (1964). He was twice nominated for a Primetime Emmy Award, including for his portrayal of Matthew Harrison Brady in a television adaptation of Inherit the Wind, a role which, ten years before, had earned him the Tony Award. Additionally, he was a one-time Golden Globe, two-time Laurel Award, and three-time Grammy Award nominee. He is the father of the actor and environmental activist Ed Begley Jr.

== Early life ==
Begley was born in Hartford, Connecticut, to two Irish immigrants, Hannah (née Clifford) and Michael Joseph Begley. After he dropped out of school as a fifth-grader, Begley ran away from home several times, going to work for "carnivals, fairs, and small circuses". Later he sold brushes, delivered milk, and served four years in the United States Navy.

== Career ==
Begley began his career as a Broadway and radio actor while in his teens. He appeared in the hit musical Going Up on Broadway in 1917 and in London the next year. He later acted in roles as Sgt. O'Hara in the radio show The Fat Man. His radio work included Stroke of Fate and a period as Charlie Chan, among other roles. He also starred in the 1950s radio program Richard Diamond, Private Detective, playing Lieutenant Walter Levinson, head of homicide at the 5th Precinct, Manhattan. He was elected a member of The Lambs in 1943. In the late 1940s, he began appearing regularly in supporting film roles.

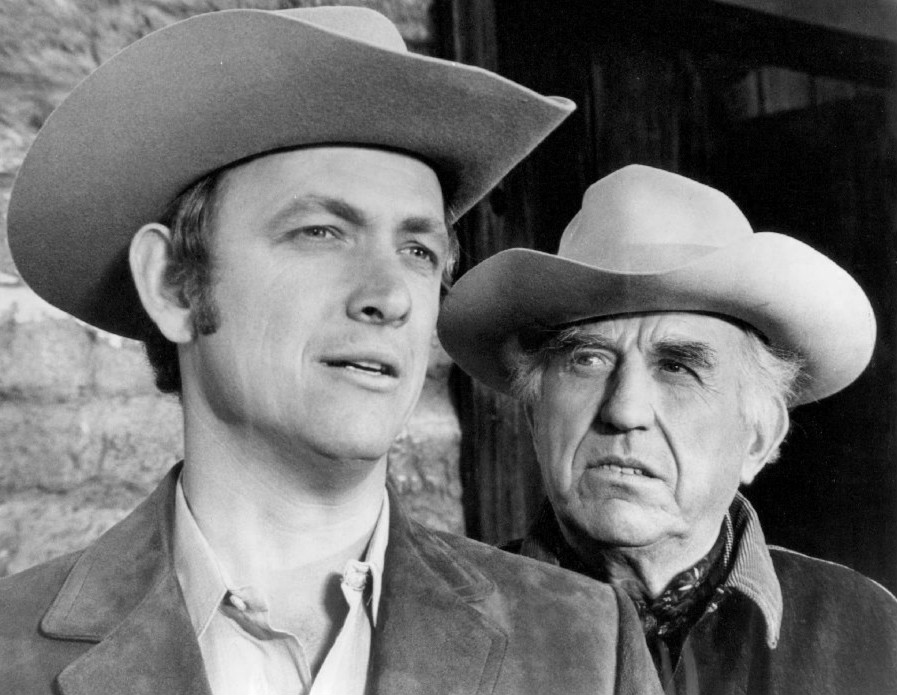
Begley (right) with Monte Markham in 1969

In the 1952–1953 television season, Begley co-starred with Eddie Albert in the CBS sitcom Leave It to Larry. In 1954 Begley starred in the NBC Television show Robert Montgomery Presents in "Big Boy", an episode sponsored by Lucky Strike, as Joe Grant, an engineer for the Union Pacific Railroad living in Cheyenne, Wyoming, who worked on the famous Union Pacific Big Boy steam locomotives. The show is about how Begley's character copes with the transition from steam locomotives to diesel locomotives in the 1950s.

He won the Academy Award for Best Supporting Actor for his role in Sweet Bird of Youth (1962). Some of his other notable films include Deadline – U.S.A. (1952), 12 Angry Men (1957) as juror #10, Odds Against Tomorrow (1959), The Unsinkable Molly Brown (1964), and Wild in the Streets (1968). One notable role Begley played both on television (twice in 1955) and in the theatrical film (1956) is William (Bill) Briggs, one of the three primary characters in Rod Serling's Patterns.

In 1956, he appeared in the Broadway production of Inherit the Wind, in the role of Matthew Harrison Brady. For this performance, he won the Tony Award for Best Featured Actor in a Play. In 1968 he appeared with Clint Eastwood in the classic Western Hang 'Em High.

His other television work included appearances on the 1954 TV series Justice, Empire, The Virginian, Bonanza, The Fugitive, The Dick Van Dyke Show, Target: The Corruptors, The Invaders, The Wild Wild West, My Three Sons, Wagon Train and Going My Way, with Gene Kelly. Among his many Broadway credits were All My Sons and Our Town.

== Personal life ==
Begley married his first wife, Amanda Huff, in 1922; they had two children. Huff died in 1957. His second marriage ended in divorce and his third wife, Helen, survived him. Begley is father of actor Ed Begley Jr., from his extramarital relationship with Allene Jeanne Sanders. His younger brother, Martin Begley, worked briefly for him as his manager. Both were members of The Lambs in New York.

== Death ==
Begley died of a heart attack while attending a party at the home of Jay Bernstein in Hollywood, California, on April 28, 1970. He is buried at the San Fernando Mission Cemetery in Mission Hills, California.

== Filmography ==
Year	Title	Role	Notes
1947	Body and Soul	Party leader	Uncredited
1947	The Web	Man	Uncredited
1947	Boomerang	Paul Harris	
1947	The Roosevelt Story	Narrator	Documentary
1948	Sitting Pretty	Horatio J. Hammond	
1948	The Street with No Name	Chief Bernard Harmatz	
1948	Deep Waters	Josh Hovey	
1948	Sorry, Wrong Number	James Cotterell	
1949	Tulsa	John J. 'Johnny' Brady	as Edward Begley
1949	It Happens Every Spring	Edgar Stone	
1949	The Great Gatsby	Myron Lupus	
1950	Backfire	Captain Garcia	
1950	Stars in My Crown	Lon Backett	
1950	Convicted	Mackay, Head of Parole Board	
1950	Saddle Tramp	August Hartnagle	
1950	Wyoming Mail	Prison Warden Haynes	
1950	Dark City	Barney	
1951	You're in the Navy Now	Port Commander	
1951	The Lady from Texas	Dave Blodgett	
1951	On Dangerous Ground	Captain Brawley	
1952	Boots Malone	Howard Whitehead	
1952	Lone Star	Senator Anthony Demmet	
1952	Deadline – U.S.A.	Frank Allen	
1952	The Turning Point	Neil Eichelberger	
1954	Big Boy	Joe Grant	
1955	Kraft Television Theatre (TV)	Andy Sloane	Episode: "Patterns"; Nominated – Primetime Emmy Award for Best Actor in a Supporting Role
1956	Patterns	William Briggs	
1957	12 Angry Men	Juror #10	
1959	Odds Against Tomorrow	Dave Burke	
1961	The Green Helmet	Bartell	
1962	Sweet Bird of Youth	Tom 'Boss' Finley	Academy Award for Best Supporting Actor; Nominated – Golden Globe Award for Best Supporting Actor – Motion Picture; Nominated – Laurel Award for Top Male Supporting Performance
1962	Naked City	Jimmy Fenton	Season 4, Episode 9
1962	My Three Sons (TV)	Ed Wallace, Carl Storffmann	Season 2, Episode 15 & Season 9, Episode 13
1963	Route 66 (TV)	Kyle Hawkes	Season 3, Episode 21
1964	The Unsinkable Molly Brown	Seamus Tobin	Nominated – Laurel Award for Top Male Supporting Performance
1964	Rawhide (TV)	Piney Kinney	Season 7, Episode 3
1964	The Virginian (TV)	Micah Ellis, Mike Tyrone	(2 episodes) Season 2, Episode 15 & Season 4, Episode 19
1965	The Dick Van Dyke Show (TV)	Judge	Season 4, Episode 21
1965	The Fugitive (TV-1963)	Dan Brady	Season 2, Episode 27
1965	Inherit the Wind (TV)	Matthew Harrison Brady	Nominated – Primetime Emmy Award for Outstanding Single Performance by an Actor in a Leading Role in a Drama
1965	Gunsmoke (TV)	Jeb Crater	
1965	Bonanza	Dan Tolliver/Clint Watson	2 episodes
1966	The Oscar	Grobard	
1966	The Wild Wild West (TV Series)	Season 2, Episode 14 Night of the Infernal Machine	
1966	The Lucy Show (TV Series)	Andrew Bailey	Season 5, Episode 3
1967	Warning Shot	Captain Roy Klodin	
1967	The Violent Enemy	Colum O'More	
1967	Billion Dollar Brain	General Midwinter	
1967	Do Not Fold, Staple, Spindle or Mutilate	Scotty Duncan	
1968	Firecreek	Preacher Broyles	
1968	Wild in the Streets	Senator Allbright	
1968	Hang 'Em High	Captain Wilson, Cooper Hanging Party	
1968	A Time to Sing	Kermit Dodd	
1969	The Monitors	President	
1969	Secrets of the Pirate's Inn	Dennis McCarthy	TV film
1970	The Dunwich Horror	Henry Armitage	
1970	Neither Are We Enemies	Annas	Hallmark Hall of Fame Easter special
1970	Road to Salina	Warren	Posthumous release (final film role)
1970	Corwin (TV series)	Stan Holindrake	Posthumous release; Season 2, Episode 1

== Radio ==
Date	Show	Episode	Role	Notes
1944–48	Charlie Chan	All	Charlie Chan	
1946–1951	The Fat Man	Various episodes	Sgt. O'Hara	
1947	Mollé Mystery Theatre	"Goodbye, Darling"	George Lucas	
1947	The Adventures of Philip Marlowe	"The Friend From Detroit"		
1948	The Whistler	"Hired Alibi"		with Jack Webb
1949–53	Richard Diamond, Private Detective	Various episodes	Lt. Levinson	
1949	Let George Do It	"The Man Under the Elm Tree"	Darrell	
1949	Our Miss Brooks	"Mr. Conklin's Wakeup Call"		
1951	Fibber McGee and Molly	"Hitchhiking Bureau"	Tilford C. Crabfish	
1951	Tales of the Texas Rangers	"Blind Justice"	Unknown	
1951	Tales of the Texas Rangers	"No Living Witnesses"	Unknown	
1951	Tales of the Texas Rangers	"Paid in Full"	Unknown	
1951	Tales of the Texas Rangers	"The Blow Off"	Unknown	
1952	Tales of the Texas Rangers	"Birds of a Feather"	Unknown	
1952	Tales of the Texas Rangers	"Prelude to Felony"	Unknown	

== Awards and nominations ==
Year	Award	Category	Nominated work	Results	Ref.
1962	Academy Awards	Best Supporting Actor	Sweet Bird of Youth	Won	
1962	Golden Globe Awards	Best Supporting Actor – Motion Picture	Sweet Bird of Youth	Nominated	
1958	Grammy Awards	Best Performance, Documentary or Spoken Word	Great American Speeches	Nominated	
1962	Laurel Awards	Top Male Supporting Performance	Sweet Bird of Youth	Nominated	
1964	Laurel Awards	Top Male Supporting Performance	The Unsinkable Molly Brown	Nominated	
1956	Primetime Emmy Awards	Best Actor in a Supporting Role	Kraft Television Theatre (Episode: "Patterns")	Nominated	
1966	Primetime Emmy Awards	Outstanding Single Performance by an Actor in a Leading Role in a Drama	Inherit the Wind	Nominated	
1956	Tony Awards	Best Supporting or Featured Actor in a Play	Inherit the Wind	Won	
