= The Strike (Studio One) =

- Westinghouse Studio One episode
- James Daly as Major Gaylord
- Episode no.: Season 6 Episode 38
- Directed by: Franklin J. Schaffner
- Written by: Rod Serling
- Original air date: June 7, 1954

Guest appearances
- James Daly as Major Gaylord; Roy Roberts as Chaplain Walker; Bert Freed as Chick; Frank Marth as Franks

Episode chronology
← Previous —	Next → "A Letter to Mr. Gubbins"

"The Strike" was an American television play broadcast on June 7, 1954, as part of the CBS television series Westinghouse Studio One. Written by Rod Serling and directed by Franklin J. Schaffner, the drama is set during the darkest period of the Korean War, focusing on the stress of command in sacrificing troops in combat. The running time was 59:21, including breaks hosted by Betty Furness, promoting Westinghouse refrigerators, stoves, room air conditioners, and dehumidifiers.

== Plot ==
The play is set in North Korea in January 1951, after China intervened in the Korean War and forced the United Nations forces into retreat.

=== Part One ===
Major Gaylord (played by James Daly), a professional soldier who also served in World War II, commands the 29th Regiment, a 500-soldier infantry unit that is pinned down on a river bank after sustaining heavy casualties. They lack transportation to evacuate their wounded and have gaps in their perimeter and only three remaining machine guns. The regiment receives an order to retreat in three hours.

The previous day, Gaylord had deployed a platoon of 20 soldiers on a patrol to assess the enemy's strength and location. The patrol has failed to return. The lieutenant in charge of the missing patrol presses for a rescue mission. Gaylord declines to put more men at risk by crossing the river in pursuit of the missing patrol.

=== Part Two ===
A radio communication is received from the missing patrol, conveying their location and planned route of escape. However, the patrol's radio is not fully operational, and they cannot receive incoming communications.

Gaylord receives word that the Air Force will conduct an air strike with bombs and napalm on the enemy's artillery on the other side of the river to protect the regiment from attack during the retreat.

The proposed strike creates a dilemma as the lost patrol last reported its position in the same location as the proposed air strike. The air strike puts the lost patrol at risk, but failure to take out the enemy artillery puts all 500 men at risk.

=== Part Three ===
The time for the strike approaches, and Gaylord must decide whether to proceed. One of the other officers advises Gaylord to sacrifice the 20 to save the 500: "We're gonna have to cross them off ... 20 for 500 .. that's not a bad price." Gaylord refuses to accept the cold logic and arithmetic of sacrificing 20 to save 500. Gaylord wants to strip off his conscience and "inject something into my immortal soul to make me numb so that I'll quit feeling, so that I'll be a commanding officer instead of my brother's keeper."

A soldier from the lost patrol is spotted swimming across the river. He is shot and killed by enemy fire as he reaches the shore.

As the time for the strike gets closer, Gaylord breaks down, unable to give a command that will kill 20 men. Gaylord's subordinate officers urge him to take command.

Helicopters arrive to evacuate the injured, and the time for the strike has arrived. Gaylord decides to give the order: "These gold leaves give me the power of god. To give, take, and trade lives. Tonight, I'm trading ... lives ... 20 boys across the river for all of ours. That's a pretty fair numerical exchange ... Inside my gut I'm gonna ache from this second on. .... These are the responsibilities of command you don't read in the West Point manual."

The regiment moves out, and the strike proceeds as Gaylord and a chaplain watch the bombs drop. Gaylord offers a final thought: "God rest their souls and God, forgive me." The chaplain assures Gaylord that God will do both.

== Cast ==
- James Daly as Major Gaylord
- Roy Roberts as Chaplain Walker
- Bert Freed as Chick
- Frank Marth as Franks
- William Leicester
- Douglas Taylor
- William Andrews
- Wyatt Cooper
- William Whitman

== Production ==
The play was produced by Felix Jackson, directed by Franklin J. Schaffner, and written for television by Rod Serling. It was broadcast on June 7, 1954, as part of the CBS television series, Westinghouse Studio One.

The teleplay was staged at least three other times. In December 1955, it was produced for Lux Radio Theatre in Australia. In February 1960, it was produced as part of Great Britain's Armchair Theatre under the title "Come in Razor Red". In May 1964, it was produced for Bob Hope Presents the Chrysler Theatre under the title, "The Command".

Serling was pleased with the work and wrote a feature-length screenplay under the title The Cold Day in Hell. In July 1956, he wrote: "Quite immodestly I'll state that I think it's a power house and should make a corker of a movie." However, it was not produced.

== Critical reception ==
Producer Felix Jackson rated the script as the best Serling had written to that point.

Gore Vidal included the script in his 1956 published collection, Best Television Plays. It was the first Serling teleplay to be published.
