= Rod Serling's Triple W: Witches, Warlocks and Werewolves =

- Cover of the first edition
- Editor: Rod Serling
- Language: English
- Genre: Fantasy and horror
- Publisher: Bantam Books
- Publication date: 1963
- Publication place: United States
- Media type: Print (paperback)
- Pages: 181

Rod Serling's Triple W: Witches, Warlocks and Werewolves is an anthology of fantasy and horror stories ghost-edited by Gordon R. Dickson, one of whose own stories appears here. It was first published by Bantam Books in 1963. The stories had originally appeared in the magazines Fantasy & Science Fiction, Unknown, New England Magazine, Fantastic, The Pioneer and Beyond Fantasy Fiction. The anthology by the same name was also a half hour television program in the 1960s. Rod Serling provided the introduction.

== Contents ==
- "The Amulet", by Gordon R. Dickson
- "The Story of Sidi Nonman", Anonymous
- "The Final Ingredient", by Jack Sharkey
- "Blind Alley", by Malcolm Jameson
- "Young Goodman Brown", by Nathaniel Hawthorne
- "The Chestnut Beads", by Jane Roberts
- "Hatchery of Dreams", by Fritz Leiber
- "The Mark of the Beast", by Rudyard Kipling
- "And Not Quite Human", by Joe L. Hensley
- "Wolves Don’t Cry", by Bruce Elliott
- "The Black Retriever", by Charles G. Finney
- "Witch Trials and the Law", by Charles Mackay
