= Kraft Television Theatre =

1947–1958 anthology drama television series

- Ed Begley, Everett Sloane. and Richard Kiley in Rod Serling's "Patterns" on Kraft Television Theatre (1955)
- Also known as: Kraft Mystery Theatre
- Genre: Anthology drama
- Narrated by: Ed Herlihy (1947-55); Charles Stark (1955)
- Theme music composer: Norman Cloutier
- Country of origin: United States
- Original language: English
- No. of seasons: 11
- No. of episodes: 650

Production
- Camera setup: Multi-camera
- Running time: 48–52 minutes
- Production companies: J. Walter Thompson Agency; Talent Associates

Original release
- Network: NBC
- Release: May 7, 1947 – October 1, 1958

Kraft Television Theatre is an American anthology drama television series running from 1947 to 1958. It began May 7, 1947, on NBC, airing at 7:30 pm on Wednesday evenings until December of that year. It first promoted MacLaren's Imperial Cheese, which was advertised nowhere else. In January 1948, it moved to 9:00 pm on Wednesdays, continuing in that time slot until 1958. Initially produced by the J. Walter Thompson advertising agency, the live, hour-long series offered television plays with new stories and new characters each week, in addition to adaptations of such classics as A Christmas Carol and Alice in Wonderland.

The program was broadcast live from Studio 8H at 30 Rockefeller Plaza, currently the home of Saturday Night Live. For the entirety of its 11 1/2-year run, Kraft Television Theatre presented a newly produced episode every Wednesday evening for 52 weeks a year (including on Wednesdays that happened to fall on Christmas or other holidays), with no repeat broadcasts. The episode "Patterns" was presented twice, but each broadcast was a separate live production.

Beginning October 1953, ABC added a separate series (also titled Kraft Television Theatre), created to promote Kraft's new Cheez Whiz product. This series ran for 15 months, telecast on Thursday evenings at 9:30 pm, until January 1955. After Kraft cancelled the second show, it changed its sponsor to become Pond's Theatre on ABC-TV from March 1955, while the original Kraft Theatre continued on NBC-TV.

== Background ==
A prestige show for NBC, it launched the careers of more than a few actors, directors, and playwrights, including future Emmy-winning and Academy Award-nominated actress Hope Lange.

Actors on the series included James Dean, Janet De Gore, Colleen Dewhurst, Anne Francis, Lee Grant, Helen Hayes, Jack Lemmon, Grace Kelly, Jack Klugman, Cloris Leachman, Sam Levene, Patrick McVey, Michael Higgins, Felicia Montealegre Bernstein, John Newland, Paul Newman, Leslie Nielsen, Anthony Perkins, Judson Pratt, silent film icon Esther Ralston, Lee Remick, George C. Scott, Rod Steiger, Joan Tompkins (her first television role), Grace Carney, and Joanne Woodward. Announcers for the show were Ed Herlihy (1947–1955) and Charles Stark (1955). In 1958, young performers Martin Huston and Zina Bethune appeared in "This Property Is Condemned", based on a Tennessee Williams play, the last show of Kraft Television Theatre.

Directors for the series included Sidney Lumet, Robert Altman, George Roy Hill, Fielder Cook, and John Boulting, and the many contributing writers included Rod Serling, William Templeton, and JP Miller. Serling won an Emmy for scripting "Patterns" (January 12, 1955), the best-remembered episode of the series. The drama had such an impact that it made television history by staging a second live encore performance three weeks later and was developed as a feature film, also titled Patterns.

In April 1958, Kraft sold the rights to David Susskind's Talent Associates, which revamped the series as Kraft Mystery Theatre. Under that title, it continued until September 1958. However, this eventually evolved into the 1963 filmed series Kraft Suspense Theatre, which concentrated exclusively on original dramas written for television, not on adaptations.

Between 1947 and 1958, the Kraft Television Theatre presented more than 650 comedies and dramas. The series finished at number 14 in the Nielsen ratings for the 1950–1951 season, number 23 for 1951-1952, and number 21 for 1953–1954.

== Episode status ==
Excerpts from several 1947 episodes and part of a reel of 1947 television clips are held by the Library of Congress. In addition, the Library of Congress holds a large number of complete episodes, including five from 1948. The American Heritage Center has a number of scripts from various episodes for the years 1947, 1948, and 1949 in the Edmund C. Rice papers. These scripts, though authored by various people, were edited by Rice.

== Episodes ==
Partial List of Episodes of Kraft Television Theatre
Date	Episode	Actor(s)
June 25, 1947	"I Like it Here"	Stefan Schnabel, Alice Yourman, Sterling Oliver, Betty Beuhler, Arthur Franz, Mel Brandt, Leopold Badia
February 15, 1950	"The Silent Room"	Tommy Nello, Neva Patterson, Jesse White, Dorothy Storm, Bruno Wick, Gene Fuller
February 6, 1952	"Follow the Dream"	Vivian Ferrar, Royal Beal
October 8, 1952	"The New Tenant"	Blanche Yurke, Alan Bunce, Katherine Meskill
October 15, 1952	"A Kiss for Cinderella"	Melville Cooper, Mary Stearn, Leslie Nielsen, Rita Vale, Nancy Marchand, Susan Halloran, Patti McCormack, Gaye Huston, Betty Low, Rex O'Malley
October 22, 1952	"A Long Night In Forty Mile"	John Baragrey, Hildy Parks, Fred Stewart, Alan Shayne, Carol Wheeler, Dan Morgan, Joe Maross, Curtis Cooksey, Jack Arthur, Stuart Mackintosh
October 29, 1952	"Divine Drudge"	Felicia Monteleagre, Harry Townes, Robert Pastene, Mike Kellin, Timothy Lynn Kearse, Noel Leslie, Geoffrey Lumb, Cynthia Latham, William Brower
November 5, 1952	"Melody Jones"	Janet Lally, Patsy Bruder, Patti O'Neill, John McGovern, Peggy Allenby, Katherine Meskill, Jimmy Sommer, Jackie Colloris, Bob Casey, Robert McQuade, Steve Harris.
November 12, 1952	"Hilda McKahy"	Haila Stoddard, Shepperd Strudwick, Thomas Coley, Pat Breslin, Leta Bonynge
November 19, 1952	"The Quiet Wedding"	Alan Holmes, Petrena Lowthian, Edith Meiser, Pamela Simpson, Leslie Paul, Anthony Kemble Cooper, Carol Veazie, Anita Bolster, Carolyn Grier, Catherine Doucet, Guy Spaull, David Orrick
October 14, 1953	"Keep Our Honor Bright"	Michael Higgins, Joan Potter, Larry Fletcher, James Dean, Addison Richards, Peter Fernandez, John Dutra, Don Dubbins, Jim Hickman, Cricket Skilling, George Roy Hill
March 11, 1954	"Dark Victory"	Leora Dana, Duane McKinney
December 1, 1954	"The Independent"	Frances Robinson, Jeffrey Lynn, Joey Fallon
January 12, 1955	"Patterns"	Everett Sloane, Richard Kiley, Ed Begley, June Dayton, Joanna Roos, Elizabeth Montgomery, Elizabeth Wilson, Jack Arthur, Victoria Ward, Sybil Baker, Shirley Standlee, Theodore Newton, Jack Livesey, Ronnie Welsh, Tom Charles, Ron Harper, Victor Harrison, Helen Ludlom, Joseph MacCauley, Al Morgen, Douglas Rutherford, Chuck Wallace
February 9, 1955	"Patterns" (restaged, i.e. a second live production)	Everett Sloane, Richard Kiley, Ed Begley, June Dayton, Joanna Roos, Elizabeth Montgomery, Elizabeth Wilson, Jack Arthur, Victoria Ward, Sybil Baker, Shirley Standlee, Theodore Newton, Jack Livesey, Ronnie Welsh, Tom Charles, Ron Harper, Victor Harrison, Helen Ludlom, Joseph MacCauley, Al Morgen, Douglas Rutherford, Chuck Wallace
September 19, 1956	"Out to Kill"	James Whitmore.
