= Fielder Cook =

American film and television director

- Born: March 9, 1923; Atlanta, Georgia, United States
- Died: June 20, 2003 (aged 80); Charlotte, North Carolina, United States
- Occupations: Film director, television director

Fielder Cook (March 9, 1923 – June 20, 2003) was an American television and film director, producer, and writer, whose 1971 television film, The Homecoming: A Christmas Story, spawned the series The Waltons.

== Biography and career ==
Born in Atlanta, Georgia, Cook graduated with honors with a bachelor of arts degree in literature from Washington and Lee University, then studied Elizabethan drama at the University of Birmingham in England. He returned to the United States and began his career in the early days of television, directing many episodes of such anthology series as Lux Video Theater, The Kaiser Aluminum Hour, Playhouse 90, Omnibus, and Kraft Television Theatre. In his later years, he directed the television movies Judge Horton and the Scottsboro Boys, A Love Affair: The Eleanor and Lou Gehrig Story, Gauguin the Savage, Family Reunion, I Know Why the Caged Bird Sings, Will There Really Be a Morning?, and others; adaptations of The Philadelphia Story, Harvey, Brigadoon, Beauty and the Beast, The Price, Miracle on 34th Street, and The Member of the Wedding; and episodes of Ben Casey, The Defenders, and Beacon Hill.

Cook's credits for feature films include A Big Hand for the Little Lady, How to Save a Marriage and Ruin Your Life (1968), Prudence and the Pill (1968, co-director), From the Mixed-Up Files of Mrs. Basil E. Frankweiler (1973), Eagle in a Cage, and Seize the Day.

Cook died in Charlotte, North Carolina, from complications from a stroke.

== Selected filmography ==
- Patterns (1956)
- Home Is the Hero (1959)
- The Philadelphia Story (TV movie - 1959)
- A String of Beads (TV movie - 1961)
- The Farmer's Daughter (TV movie - 1962)
- Focus (TV movie - 1962)
- The Fifty Minute Hour (TV movie - 1962)
- Brigadoon (TV movie - 1966)
- A Big Hand for the Little Lady (1966)
- How to Save a Marriage and Ruin Your Life (1968)
- Prudence and the Pill (1968)
- Hallmark Hall of Fame: Teacher, Teacher (1969)
- Mirror, Mirror Off the Wall (TV movie - 1969)
- Who Killed the Mysterious Mr. Foster? (TV movie - 1971)
- Goodbye, Raggedy Ann (TV movie - 1971)
- Neighbors (TV movie - 1971)
- The Homecoming: A Christmas Story (TV movie - 1971)
- Eagle in a Cage (1972)
- The Hands of Cormac Joyce (TV movie - 1972)
- From the Mixed-Up Files of Mrs. Basil E. Frankweiler (1973)
- Miracle on 34th Street (TV movie - 1973)
- Pomroy's People (TV movie - 1973)
- This Is the West That Was (TV movie - 1974)
- Miles to Go Before I Sleep (TV movie - 1975)
- Valley Forge (TV movie - 1975)
- The Rivalry (TV movie - 1975)
- Judge Horton and the Scottsboro Boys (TV movie - 1976)
- Beauty and the Beast (TV movie - 1976)
- A Love Affair: The Eleanor & Lou Gehrig Story (TV movie - 1978)
- Too Far to Go (TV movie - 1979)
- I Know Why the Caged Bird Sings (TV movie - 1979)
- Gauguin the Savage (TV movie - 1980)
- Family Reunion (TV movie - 1981)
- Will There Really Be a Morning? (TV movie - 1983)
- Why Me? (1984)
- Seize the Day (1986)
- A Special Friendship (TV movie - 1987)
- Circus (TV movie - 1988)
- The Member of the Wedding (1997)

== Awards and nominations ==
- 1959 9th Berlin International Film Festival Golden Bear Award (Home Is the Hero, nominee)
- 1963 Emmy Award for Outstanding Directorial Achievement in Drama (Big Deal in Laredo on The DuPont Show of the Month, nominee)
- 1967 Emmy Award for Outstanding Directorial Achievement in Variety or Music (Brigadoon, winner)
- 1967 Emmy Award for Outstanding Musical Program (Brigadoon, winner)
- 1969 Emmy Award for Outstanding Directorial Achievement in Drama (Teacher, Teacher on Hallmark Hall of Fame, nominee)
- 1971 Emmy Award for Outstanding Directorial Achievement in Drama (The Price on Hallmark Hall of Fame, winner)
- 1972 Emmy Award for Outstanding Directorial Achievement in Drama (The Homecoming: A Christmas Story, nominee)
- 1976 Emmy Award for Outstanding Directing in a Drama Series (Beacon Hill, nominee)
- 1977 Emmy Award for Outstanding Directing in a Special Program (Judge Horton and the Scottsboro Boys, nominee)
- 1987 Sundance Film Festival Grand Jury Prize for Drama (Seize the Day, nominee)
