= Everett Sloane =

American actor (1909–1965)

- Sloane in 1953
- Born: October 1, 1909; New York City, U.S.
- Died: August 6, 1965 (aged 55); Los Angeles, California, U.S.
- Resting place: Angelus-Rosedale Cemetery
- Occupation: Actor
- Years active: 1927–1965
- Spouse: Lillian Herman (m. 1933)
- Children: 2

Everett H. Sloane (October 1, 1909 – August 6, 1965) was an American character actor who worked in radio, theatre, films, and television.

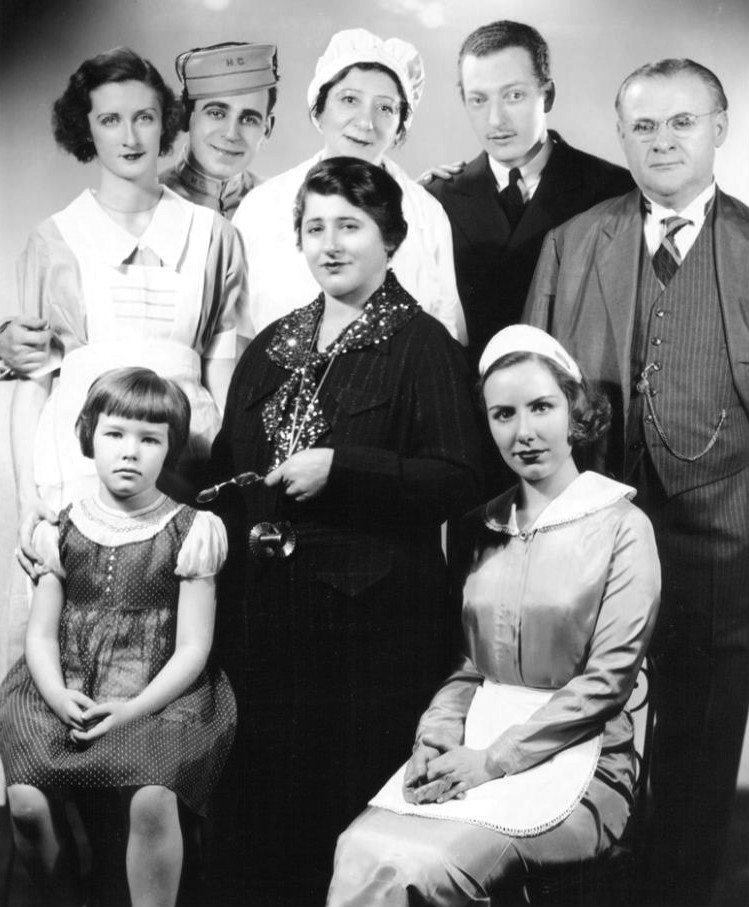
The cast of Gertrude Berg's radio series House of Glass (1935); Sloane is located second from right in the back row.

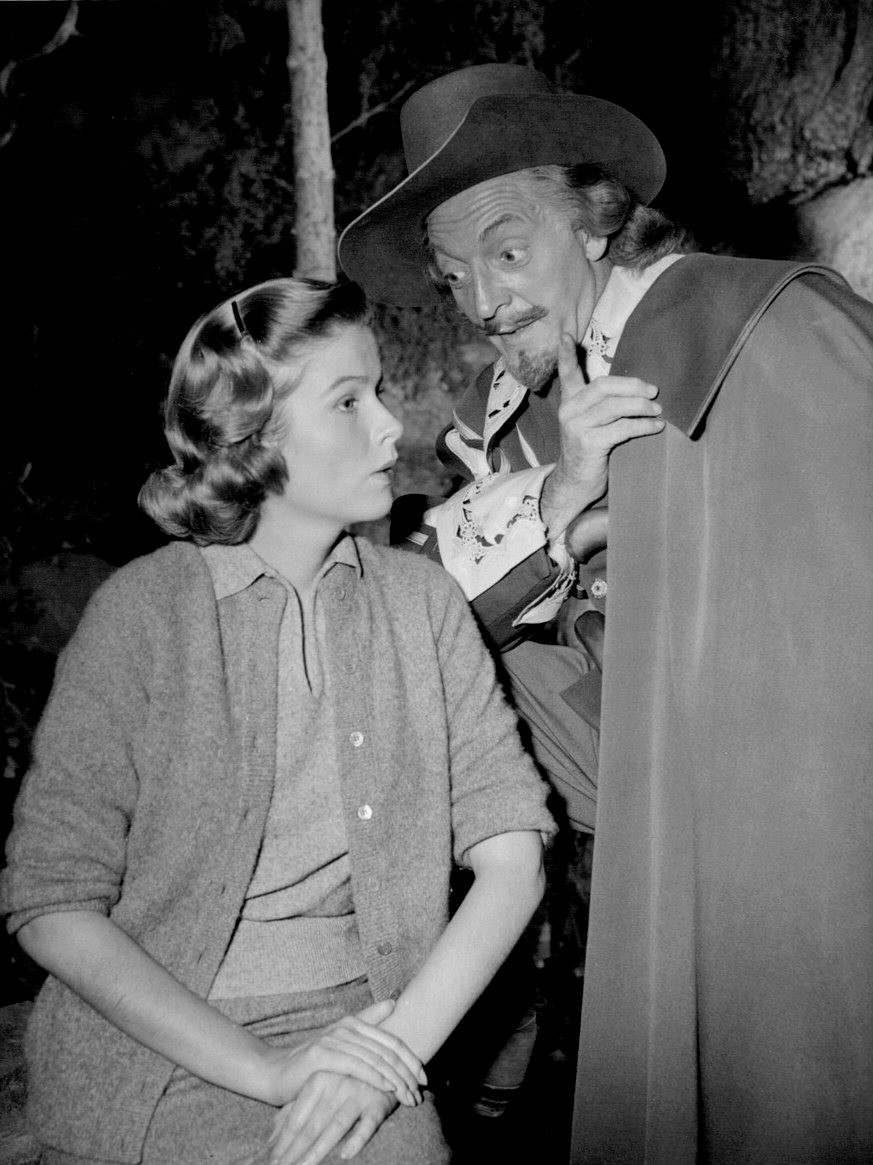
With Nancy Olson in the musical television adaptation of High Tor on Ford Star Jubilee (1956)

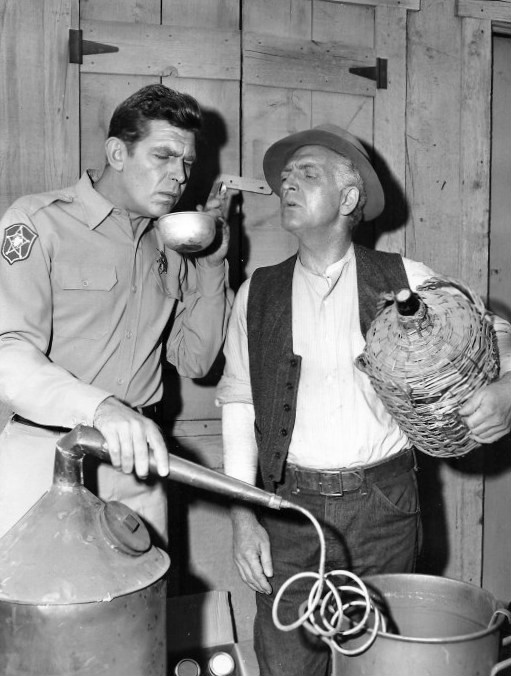
On The Andy Griffith Show (1962)

== Early life ==
Sloane was born in Manhattan on October 1, 1909, to Nathaniel I. Sloane and Rose (Gerstein) Sloane. Aged seven, he played Puck in a production of William Shakespeare's A Midsummer Night's Dream at Manhattan's Public School 46, and decided to become an actor. He completed two years at the University of Pennsylvania, and left in 1927 to join Jasper Deeter's Hedgerow Theatre repertory company. He made his New York stage debut in 1928. Sloane took a Wall Street job as a stockbroker's runner, but when his salary was cut in half after the stock market crash of 1929, he began to supplement his income with radio work. He became the sleuth's assistant on WOR's Impossible Detective Mysteries, played the title character's sidekick, Denny, in Bulldog Drummond and went on to perform in thousands of radio programs.

Sloane married Lillian (Lovey/Luba) Herman, a stage and radio actress, on January 4, 1933, in Manhattan.

== Career ==
Sloane made his Broadway debut in 1935, playing Rosetti the agent in George Abbott's hit comedy, Boy Meets Girl.

Sloane was a member of the repertory company that presented the radio news dramatization series The March of Time. "It was like a stock company, whose members were the aristocrats of this relatively new profession of radio acting," wrote fellow actor Joseph Julian. At that time Julian had to content himself with being an indistinguishable voice in crowd scenes, envying this "hallowed circle" that included Sloane, Kenny Delmar, Arlene Francis, Gary Merrill, Agnes Moorehead, Jeanette Nolan, Paul Stewart, Orson Welles, Richard Widmark, Art Carney, Ray Collins, Pedro de Cordoba, Ted de Corsia, Juano Hernandez, Nancy Kelly, John McIntire, Jack Smart, and Dwight Weist. The March of Time was one of radio's most popular shows.

Sloane's radio work led him to be hired by Orson Welles to become part of his Mercury Theatre. Sloane recorded one program with The Mercury Theatre on the Air and became a regular player when the show was picked up by a sponsor and became The Campbell Playhouse. Sloane moved with the rest of the company to Los Angeles to continue recording the show after Welles signed his contract with RKO Pictures. In 1941, Sloane played Mr. Bernstein in Welles' first movie, Citizen Kane. After filming had wrapped, Sloane returned to New York to perform (together with fellow Kane stars Ray Collins and Paul Stewart) in Mercury Theatre's last play, Richard Wright's Native Son, which had 114 performances from March to June 1941. Although he did not appear in Welles's second film, The Magnificent Ambersons, in 1943, he joined fellow Mercury Theatre alumni Welles, Joseph Cotten, Agnes Moorehead, and Ruth Warrick in Journey into Fear. In 1947, Sloane also starred as villainous lawyer Arthur Bannister in The Lady from Shanghai, produced and directed by Welles, who also starred. He played an assassin in Renaissance-era Italy opposite Welles' Cesare Borgia in Prince of Foxes (1949).

Sloane portrayed a doctor for paraplegic World War II veterans in 1950's The Men with Marlon Brando (in his film debut).

Sloane's Broadway theater career ended in 1960 with From A to Z, a revue for which he wrote several songs. In between, he acted in plays such as Native Son (1941), A Bell for Adano (1944), and Room Service (1953), and directed the melodrama The Dancer (1946).

In the 1940s, Sloane was a frequent guest star on the radio theater series Inner Sanctum Mystery and The Shadow (as comic relief Shrevie, the cab driver, among other roles), and was in The Mysterious Traveler episode "Survival of the Fittest" with Kermit Murdock. Sloane co-starred with Tony Curtis and Piper Laurie in Universal's 1951 The Prince Who Was a Thief as a thief who adopts a baby and raises the child as his own. In 1953, he starred as Captain Frank Kennelly in the CBS radio crime drama 21st Precinct. In 1957, he co-starred in the ninth episode of Suspicion co-starring Audie Murphy and Jack Warden. In 1958, he played Walter Brennan's role in a remake of To Have and Have Not called The Gun Runners.

Sloane also worked extensively on television. In 1950, for example, he portrayed Vincent van Gogh in The Philco-Goodyear Television Playhouse's production "The Life of Vincent Van Gogh". Later, in November 1955, he starred in the Alfred Hitchcock Presents episode "Our Cook's a Treasure". He appeared on the NBC anthology series The Joseph Cotten Show, also known as On Trial, in the 1956 episode "Law Is for the Lovers", with co-star Inger Stevens.

Sloane performed renditions of passages from The Great Gatsby on the NBC program devoted to F. Scott Fitzgerald in August 1955, part of the "Biography in Sound" series on great American authors.

Sloane appeared in Walt Disney's Zorro series in 1957–1958 as Andres Felipe Basilio, in the "Man from Spain" episodes. He also appeared in a few episodes of Bonanza and an episode in Rawhide.

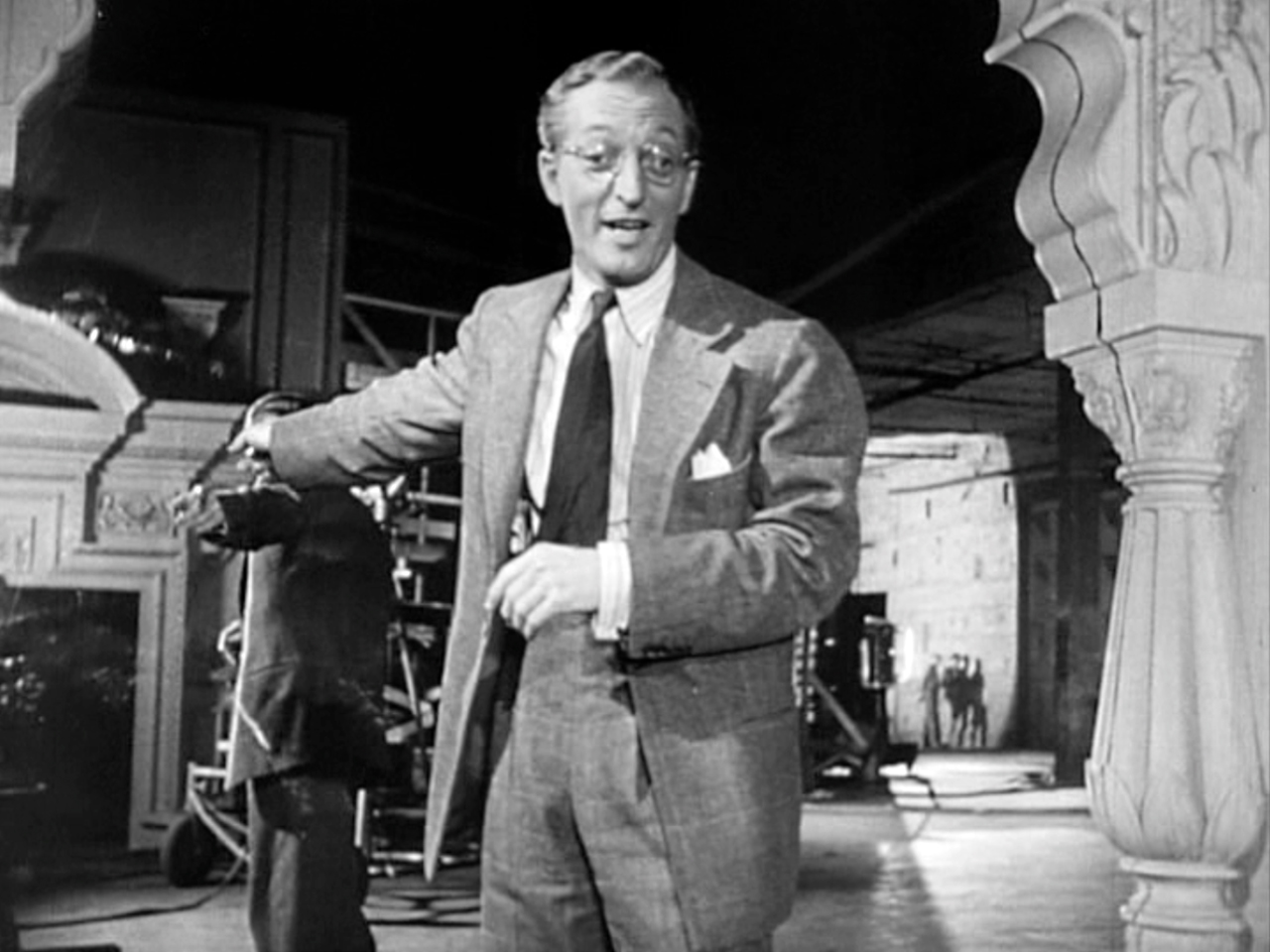
Sloane on the set of Citizen Kane (1941)

On March 7, 1959, he guest-starred in an episode of NBC's Cimarron City titled "The Ratman", appearing alongside the show's star, John Smith. Later that same year, Sloane appeared as a guest in "Stage Stop", the premiere episode of John Smith's second NBC Western series, Laramie. He played the vengeful, grieving father Tate Bradley on "Wanted: Dead or Alive" S2 E10 "Reckless" which aired 11/6/1959.

In 1961, Sloane appeared in an episode of The Asphalt Jungle. In the early 1960s, he voiced the title character of The Dick Tracy Show in 130 cartoons. Beginning in 1964, he provided character voices for the animated TV series Jonny Quest. He also starred in the ABC sci-fi television series Voyage to the Bottom of the Sea, in the episode "Hot Line". He wrote the unused lyrics to "The Fishin' Hole", the theme song for The Andy Griffith Show. Sloane guest-starred on the show in 1962, playing Jubal Foster in the episode "The Keeper of the Flame". He starred in both the film and television versions of Rod Serling's Patterns, and in the first season of The Twilight Zone in the episode "The Fever". He guest starred as a San Francisco attorney in the 1962 Perry Mason episode "The Case of the Poison Pen Pal".

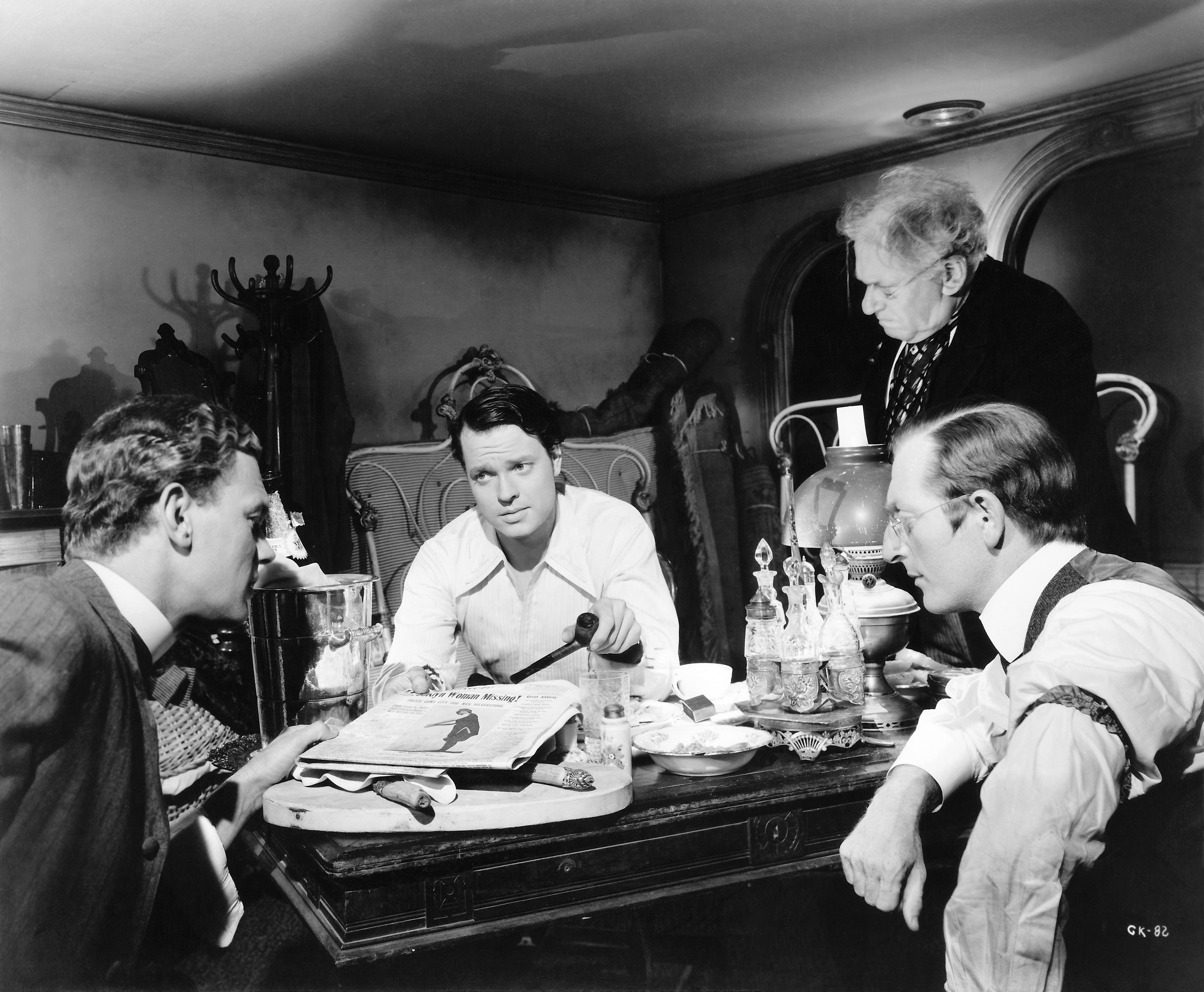
Joseph Cotten, Orson Welles, Everett Sloane, and Erskine Sanford in Citizen Kane

In 1963, he guest-starred on The Dick Van Dyke Show in the episode "I'm No Henry Walden" as writer Henry Walden. That same year he starred in the episode "Quint's Trail" on the TV Western Series Gunsmoke (S9E7) as Cyrus Neff, a concerned father taking his family to Oregon for a new life after his daughter killed a man for forcibly taking her.

== Death ==
Sloane died by suicide at age 55 on August 6, 1965; he took an overdose of barbiturates because he feared he was going blind as a result of glaucoma. Sloane's cremated remains are interred at Angelus-Rosedale Cemetery in Los Angeles.

== Film and television ==
- Citizen Kane (1941) – Mr. Bernstein
- Journey into Fear (1943) – Kopeikin
- The Lady from Shanghai (1947) – Arthur Bannister
- Jigsaw (1949) – Sam the Milkman (uncredited, cameo appearance)
- Prince of Foxes (1949) – Mario Belli
- The Philco Television Playhouse TV Series (1950 season episode "Life of Vincent van Gogh") – Vincent van Gogh
- The Men (1950) – Dr. Brock
- The Enforcer (1951) – Albert Mendoza
- Bird of Paradise (1951) – The Akua
- Sirocco (1951) – General LaSalle
- The Prince Who Was a Thief (1951) – Yussef
- The Desert Fox (1951) – General Wilhelm Burgdorf
- The Blue Veil (1951) – District Attorney
- The Sellout (1952) – Nelson S. Tarsson
- Way of a Gaucho (1952) – Falcon
- Alfred Hitchcock Presents (1955) (Season 1 Episode 8: "Our Cook's A Treasure") – Ralph Montgomery
- The Big Knife (1955) – Nat Danziger
- Patterns (1956) – Mr. Ramsey
- Somebody Up There Likes Me (1956) – Irving Cohen
- Lust for Life (1956) – Dr. Gachet
- Studio One (1956) (Season 9 Episode 9: "Rachel") – Aaron Burr
- Alfred Hitchcock Presents (1956) (Season 1 Episode 22: "Place Of Shadows") – Father Vincente
- Massacre at Sand Creek (1956, TV Movie) – Colonel John Templeton
- Marjorie Morningstar (1958) – Arnold Morgenstern
- The Gun Runners (1958) – Harvey
- Alfred Hitchcock Presents (1959) (Season 4 Episode 27: "The Waxwork") – Mr. Marriner, the chief sculptor of wax figures
- Home from the Hill (1960) – Albert Halstead
- The Twilight Zone (1960 season one episode "The Fever") – Franklin Gibbs
- Route 66 (1960 season one episode "Black November") – Mr. Garth
- Bonanza (TV Series) : (1960) (season 1 episode 22 "Blood on the Land") : Jeb Drummond
- The Million Dollar Incident (1961, TV Movie) – Bannister
- By Love Possessed (1961) – Dr. Reggie Shaw
- Brushfire! (1962) – Chevern McCase
- The Lady and the Stock Exchange (1962, documentary short)
- The Andy Griffith Show (1962) - Jubal Foster
- Perry Mason (1962) - "The Case of the Poison Pen Pal"
- The Man from the Diners' Club (1963) – Mr. Martindale
- The Dick Van Dyke Show (1964) - Henry Walden
- Petticoat Junction (1964 season 1 episode 21 "The Very Old Antique") - Mr. Waterhouse
- The Patsy – Caryl Fergusson
- Ready for the People (1964, TV Movie) – Paul Boyer
- The Disorderly Orderly (1964) – Mr. Tuffington
- Gunsmoke (1965) (S10E29) Episode 8: "20 Miles From Dodge") – Mr. Follansbee
- Bonanza (TV Series) : (1965) (season 6 episode 24 "Right Is the Fourth R") : Colonel Scott
- Hercules and the Princess of Troy (Sept. 1965, TV Movie) – Narrator (released posthumously)

== Radio appearances ==
Year	Program	Episode/source
1948	The Molle Mystery Theater	Solo Performance
