= Invader =

Invader, Invaders, The Invader or INVADER may refer to:

== Arts and entertainment ==
=== Film ===
- The Invaders (1912 film), a silent film
- The Invader (1935 film), a comedy starring Buster Keaton
- 49th Parallel (film) or The Invaders, a 1941 war film
- Invader (1992 film), an American science fiction movie directed by Philip Cook
- The Invader (1997 film), a science fiction movie featuring Sean Young
- The Invader (2011 film), a Belgian film
- Invader (2012 film), a Spanish-French action thriller film
- Invader (2024 film), an American horror-thriller film

=== Music ===
- The Invaders (band), a steelpan band of the 1950s from Saint Kitts
- Invaders (compilation album), a 2006 compilation of metal bands on the Kemado label
- Invaders (Karate High School album), released in 2009
- "Invader", a song from the Judas Priest 1978 album Stained Class
- "Invaders", the opening track of the Iron Maiden album The Number of the Beast
- Invader Volume 1, 2014 EP by Rapture Ruckus
- Invader (Rapture Ruckus album), 2015
- InVader, a 2016 studio album by Reckless Love
- Invader (Regurgitator album), 2024

=== Literature ===
==== Comics ====
- Invaders (comics), two Marvel Comics superhero teams

==== Novels ====
- The Invaders: A Story of Britain's Peril (1901), a novel by Louis Tracy
- The Invader (1907), a novel by Margaret Louisa Woods
- The Invader (novel), a 1928 novel by Hilda Vaughan
- The Invaders (1934), a novel by William Plomer
- The Invaders (1948), a novel by Waldo Frank
- The Invaders (1967), a novel on the TV series by Keith Laumer
- The Invader (1972), a novel by Richard Wormser
- The Invaders (1978), a novel by William Johnston, the seventh installment in the Happy Days novel series
- The Invaders (1991), a novel by Peter Danielson; the thirteenth installment in the Children of the Lion series
- The Invaders (1992), a novel by John Rowe Townsend
- The Invaders (1993), a children's novel by Tony Bradman
- The Invader (1994), a children's novel by Andrew Taylor
- Invader (1994), a novel by William F. Wu; the sixth and last installment in the Isaac Asimov's Robots in Time series
- Invader (1995), a novel by C. J. Cherryh, the second book in the Foreigner series
- The Invaders (1998), a novel by John Peel; the fifth installment in The Outer Limits novel series
- The Invaders (1999), a horror novel by Brian Lumley
- The Invaders (Brotherband), a 2012 novel by John Flanagan; the second installment in the Brotherband series

==== Poems ====
- "The Invaders" by A. A. Milne, featured in When We Were Very Young (1924)

==== Short stories ====
- The Invaders and Other Stories (1887), a collection of Leo Tolstoy's short stories translated by Nathan Haskell Dole
- "The Invader" (1914), a short story by Alice and Claude Askew
- "The Invaders" (1935), a short story by John W. Campbell
- "The Invaders" (1939), a short story by Henry Kuttner
- "The Invaders" (1942), a short story by L. Ron Hubbard
- "The Invaders" (1951), a short story by Benjamin Ferris; first published in the March 1951 issue of Weird Tales
- "The Invaders" (1951), a short story by Robie Macauley
- "The Invaders" (1952), a short story by Gordon R. Dickson
- "The Invader" (1953), a short story by Alfred Coppel
- "The Invaders" (1953), a short story by Murray Leinster
- "The Invaders" (1953), a short story by Robert Spencer Carr
- "The Invaders" (1973), a short story by Stephen Tall
- The Invaders (1972), a book by Henry Treece comprising three historical stories
- Invaders! (short story collection), a 1985 collection of short stories by Gordon R. Dickson
- "The Invaders" (1988), a short story by Ted Hughes, featured in the 1988 collection Tales of the Early World
- Invaders! (anthology), a 1993 anthology of science fiction short works edited by Jack Dann and Gardner Dozois
- "The Invaders" (1999), a short story by Peter Tennant

=== Television ===
==== Episodes ====
- "Invaders", Digging for Britain series 2, episode 2 (2011)
- "Invaders" (Law & Order) season 16, episode 22 (2006)
- "Invaders", Majin Bone episode 8 (2014)
- "Invaders", Strange Days on Planet Earth episode 1 (2005)
- "Invaders", Weird, True & Freaky season 1, episode 20 (2008)
- "The Invader", Oddbods season 2, episode 55 (2016)
- "The Invader", Our Man at St. Mark's series 3, episode 2 (1965)
- "The Invader", Sea Hunt season 3, episode 30 (1960)
- "The Invader", Tales of Tomorrow season 1, episode 14 (1951)
- "The Invader", The Butcher episode 2 (2019)
- "The Invader", The First 48 season 21, episode 6 (2020)
- "The Invader", Windfalls episode 25 (1989)
- "The Invaders", Bronco season 3, episode 5 (1961)
- "The Invaders", Code R episode 5 (1977)
- "The Invaders", Dead Mount Death Play part 2, episode 13 (2023)
- "The Invaders", Death Valley Days season 7, episode 24 (1959)
- "The Invaders", G.I. Joe: A Real American Hero season 1, episode 50 (1985)
- "The Invaders", General Motors Theatre episode (1958)
- "The Invaders", ITV Television Playhouse season 2, episode 5 (1956)
- "The Invaders", Jana of the Jungle episode 8 (1978)
- "The Invaders", Joe Forrester episode 18 (1976)
- "The Invaders", Kishin Houkou Demonbane episode 4 (2006)
- "The Invaders", Life After People season 1, episode 5 (2009)
- "The Invaders", Nate Is Late season 1, episodes 51–52 (2018)
- "The Invaders", Stingray episode 29 (1965)
- "The Invaders", The Adventures of Sinbad season 2, episode 11 (1997)
- "The Invaders", The Americans episode 10 (1961)
- "The Invaders", The Big Valley season 1, episode 16 (1965)
- "The Invaders", The Forest Rangers season 3, episode 28 (1965)
- "The Invaders", The Nature of Things season 34, episode 9 (1994)
- "The Invaders" (The Twilight Zone) season 2, episode 15 (1961)
- "The Invaders", The Virginian season 2, episode 15 (1964)
- "The Invaders", The World About Us season 13, episode 4 (1979)
- "The Invaders", Voyage to the Bottom of the Sea season 1, episode 20 (1965)
- "The Invaders", Wallflowers season 2, episode 1 (2014)
- "The Invaders", Zig & Sharko season 3, episode 7a (2019)

==== Series ====
- The Invaders, a science fiction series broadcast from 1967 to 1968
- The Invaders (miniseries), a two-part television miniseries revival based on the 1967-68 series

=== Other ===
- Invader (artist) (born 1969), a French urban artist
- TI Invaders, a 1981 video game for the TI-99/4A home computer
- "The Invader", an episode of the Escape radio program broadcast on March 29, 1953
- InvadR, a wooden roller coaster at Busch Gardens Williamsburg

== Sports teams ==
- Canton Invaders, a defunct indoor soccer team, later the Columbus Invaders
- Denver Invaders, part of the Western Hockey League for the 1963–1964 season
- Hildesheim Invaders, an American football team from Hildesheim, Germany
- Indiana Invaders, an American soccer team in the USL Premier Development League
- Oakland Invaders, part of the United States Football League from 1983 to 1985

== Military aircraft ==
- Douglas A-26 Invader, an American light bomber
- North American A-36 Apache, listed in some sources as Invader, the ground attack/dive bomber version of the P-51 Mustang fighter

== Transportation ==
- Acadian (automobile) Invader, an automobile produced by General Motors of Canada
- Gilbern Invader, a car manufactured by Gilbern Sports Cars (Components) Ltd in Wales
- G-W Invader, a line of recreational power boats
- Ultra-Efficient Products Invader, an American ultralight aircraft
- INVADER, a Japanese satellite

== See also ==
- Ray Columbus & the Invaders, a New Zealand music group of the 1960s
- Lord Invader (1914-1961), calypso musician
- "Invader Invader", a 2013 song by the Japanese singer Kyary Pamyu Pamyu
- Los Invasores (Spanish for "the Invaders"), a Mexican professional wrestling group
- Invader I, ring name for José Huertas González
- Invader II, wrestling ring name for professional wrestler Roberto Soto
- Space Invaders (disambiguation)
- Invasion (disambiguation)
