= Space Invaders (disambiguation) =

Space Invaders is an arcade video game designed by Tomohiro Nishikado in 1978.

Space Invaders may also refer to:

== Games ==
- Space Invaders (Atari 2600 video game), a 1980 release of the original arcade for the Atari 2600
- Space Invaders (Atari 8-bit video game), a 1980 release of the original arcade for the Atari 400/800 computer line
- Space Invaders (1999 video game), a 1999 video game published by Activision
- Space Invaders Extreme, a 2008 remake of the original arcade game for the Nintendo DS
- Space Invaders Get Even, a 2008 spin-off of the original arcade game for the Wii
- Space Raiders (video game), a 2003 video game developed by Taito also released as Space Invaders: Invasion Day
- Astro Battle 2009, a game for the Bally Videocade/Astrocade originally released as Space Invaders

== Music ==
- "Space Invaders" (Hit'n'Hide song)
- "Space Invaders" (Player One song)
- "Space Invader", a 1980 instrumental by the English-American rock band Pretenders on the 1980 album Pretenders
- Space Invader (album), a 2014 album by former Kiss guitarist Ace Frehley

== Media ==
- Space Invaders (TV series), a 2020 Australian lifestyle television series
- Spaced Invaders, a 1990 science fiction comedy by Patrick Read Johnson
- "Space Invaders", a three episode story arc in Teenage Mutant Ninja Turtles (2003 TV series)

== Science ==
- Space Invaders (biology): a set of DNA transposon families described by Pace et al in 2008

== See also ==
- Invaders from Space, a 1964 film
- Invader (disambiguation)
- Alien invasion (disambiguation)
- Invader (artist) (born 1969), a French urban artist whose namesake is the 1978 arcade game
