= Invasion (disambiguation) =

An invasion is a military action of soldiers entering a foreign land.

Invasion may also refer to:

== Film ==
- Invasion (1966 film), a British film
- Invasión, a 1969 Argentine film
- Invasion (1970 film), a French-Italian film
- Invasion, an alternate title for the 2005 direct-to-DVD film H. G. Wells' War of the Worlds by David Michael Latt
- The Invasion (film), a 2007 American film
- Invasion (2012 film), a German-Austrian film
- Invasion (2014 film), a Panamanian film
- Invasion (2017 film), an Iranian film
- Invasion (2020 film), a Russian film

== Television ==
- Invasion (miniseries), a 1997 miniseries
- Invasion (British TV series), a 2001 BBC TV documentary
- Invasion (2005 TV series), an American television series
- Invasion (2021 TV series), an American television series
- The Invasion (Doctor Who), an eight-part Doctor Who serial from 1968

=== Episodes ===
- "Invasion", fifth episode of the 1965 Doctor Who serial The Web Planet
- "Invasion", first episode of the 1974 Doctor Who serial Invasion of the Dinosaurs
- "Invasion" (Sliders), a 1996 episode of Sliders
- "Invasion" (CSI: Miami), a 2004 episode of CSI: Miami
- "Invasion" (Foyle's War), a 2006 episode of Foyle's War
- "Invasion" (Grey's Anatomy), a 2009 episode of Grey's Anatomy
- "Invasion!" (Arrowverse), a 2016 Arrowverse (Arrow/The Flash/Supergirl/Legends of Tomorrow) television crossover event, inspired by the DC Comics series

=== Professional wrestling ===
- The Invasion (professional wrestling), a 2001 interpromotional professional wrestling storyline involving the WWF, WCW and ECW
  - WWF Invasion, a 2001 WWF professional wrestling pay-per-view

== Literature and comics ==
- Invasion (Cook novel), a 1997 novel by Robin Cook
- Invasion (Koontz novel), a 1975 novel by Dean Koontz
- Invasion (Harry novel), a 2000 novel by American author Eric L. Harry
- Invasion (Rhinehart novel), a 2016 novel by Luke Rhinehart.
- Invasion! (DC Comics), a 1989 DC Comics crossover event
- Invasion! (2000 AD), a series in early issues of the comic 2000 AD
- Invasion (2300 AD), a 1988 role-playing game supplement for 2300 AD
- Invasion: How America Still Welcomes Terrorists, Criminals, and Other Foreign Menaces to Our Shores, a 2002 nonfiction book by Michelle Malkin

== Music ==
- Invasion (Dragon Fli Empire album), 2005
- Invasion (Manilla Road album), 1980
- Invasion (Nastyboy), the first studio album by NB Ridaz
- Invasion (Upstairs), the second studio album by NB Ridaz
- Invasion, a 2015 album by Savant
- Invasion, a 2020 EP by Au5 and Prismatic
- "Invasion", song by Eisley from Combinations (album)
- "Invasion", 1979 song by Iron Maiden from The Soundhouse Tapes
- "Invasion", 2025 song by Yeji from Air
- "Invasion", song by Chumbawamba from Pictures of Starving Children Sell Records

== Games ==
- Invasion (Magic: The Gathering), an expansion to the Magic: The Gathering collectible card game
- Invasion, a strategy board game created by Dennis Wheatley and published in 1938
- Invasion, a strategy video game for the Magnavox Odyssey

== Other uses ==
- Invasion (cancer), the process by which cancer cells directly extend and penetrate into neighboring tissues in cancer

== See also ==
- Invasion U.S.A. (disambiguation)
- Invasion! (disambiguation)
- Inwazja ("Invasion"), a 2019 Polish television film
- Invader (disambiguation)
- The Invasion (disambiguation)
