= Invasion (comics) =

Invasion, in the world of comics, may refer to:

- Invasion! (DC Comics), a major storyline in the DC Universe
- Invasion! (2000 AD), a long series (with spin-offs and prequels) in 2000 AD
- British Invasion (comics), the late 1980s "invasion" of America by British comics talent

== See also ==
- Invasion (disambiguation)
