= The Invasion =

The Invasion may refer to:

== Literature ==
- The Invasion, a novel by Gerald Griffin, published 1832
- The Invasion, a novel by George Ranken as W. H. Walker, published 1877
- The Invasion: A Narrative of Events Concerning the Johnston Family of St. Mary's, the first novel by Janet Lewis, published 1932
- The Invasion, a novelization of the 1968 Doctor Who serial by Ian Marter, published 1985
- "The Invasion", a short story by Peter Crowther, published 1995
- The Invasion (Animorphs), the first book in the Animorphs series, published 1996
- The Invasion, the fifth book in the Christian Heritage Series: The Williamsburg Years sequence, a novel by Nancy Rue, published 1997
- Psychodrome III: The Invasion, the third book in the Psychodrome trilogy, a novel by Simon Hawke, published 2020
- The Invasion, a novel by Peadar Ó Guilín, published 2018

== Television ==
- The Invasion (Doctor Who), a 1968 Doctor Who serial starring Patrick Troughton

=== Episodes ===
- "The Invasion", Alien Encounters season 2, episode 1 (2013)
- "The Invasion", Armchair Theatre series 7, episode 12 (1963)
- "The Invasion", Cat episode 2 (2022)
- "The Invasion", Darna season 1, episode 2 (2022)
- "The Invasion", Everybody Loves Raymond season 3, episode 1 (1998)
- "The Invasion", Fameless season 2, episode 1 (2016)
- "The Invasion", Gilligan's Island season 3, episode 11 (1966)
- "The Invasion", Inspector Gadget season 1, episode 16 (1983)
- "The Invasion", Power Rangers Dino Fury season 2, episode 20 (2022)
- "The Invasion", Radio Active season 2, episode 2 (1999)
- "The Invasion", Safe Harbor episode 7 (1999)
- "The Invasion", Teenage Mutant Ninja Turtles season 2, episodes 25–26 (2014)
- "The Invasion", The Head season 1, episode 13 (1995)
- "The Invasion", The Ping Pong Club episode 22a (1995)
- "The Invasion", The Sparticle Mystery series 1, episode 2 (2011)
- "The Invasion", Tyler Perry's House of Payne season 1, episodes 3–4 (2006)
- "The Invasion", Watership Down, season 2, episode 11 (2000)

== Other uses ==
- The Invasion (film), a 2007 film starring Nicole Kidman and Daniel Craig
- The Invasion (album), 2011 album by Nigerian duo P-Square
- The Invasion (professional wrestling), a professional wrestling storyline from 2001
- The Invasion, a 2018 photograph by Paul Tsui of the Grand Lisboa

== See also ==
- Invasion (disambiguation)
