= Invasion! =

Invasion! may refer to:

== Media ==
- Invasion!, a four-book Star Trek mini-series
- Invasion!, the first play by Swedish writer Jonas Hassen Khemiri
- Top of the Food Chain (released in the US as Invasion!), a 1999 Canadian comedy-horror film

=== Comics ===
- Invasion! (2000 AD), a 1977–1978 comic series
- "Invasion!" (Arrowverse), the third annual Arrowverse crossover event
- Invasion! (DC Comics), a three-issue comic book limited series and crossover event published 1988–1989

== See also ==
- Invasion
- Invasion (disambiguation)
