= Alien invasion (disambiguation) =

Alien invasion is a common theme in science fiction stories and film, in which extraterrestrial life invades Earth.

Alien invasion may also refer to:

- Alien Invasion (amusement ride)
- "Alien Invasion" (Drake & Josh), a Drake & Josh episode
- Alien Invasion (film), a 2004 short film to promote environmentalism
- Alien Invasion (Water ride), a ride at Splish Splash Water Park
- Alien Invasion, a 2004 expansion for Anarchy Online
- UFO: Alien Invasion, an open source video game
