= Ultra-Efficient Products Invader =

American ultralight aircraft

Invader

General information
- Type: Ultralight aircraft
- National origin: United States
- Manufacturer: Ultra-Efficient Products
- Designer: Nick Leighty and Rick Berstling
- Status: Production completed

History
- Introduction date: 1982

The Ultra-Efficient Products Invader is an American ultralight aircraft that was designed by Nick Leighty and Rick Berstling, produced by Ultra-Efficient Products and introduced in 1982.

== Design and development ==
The Invader was designed to comply with the US FAR 103 Ultralight Vehicles rules, including the category's maximum empty weight of 254 lb (115 kg). The aircraft has a standard empty weight of 245 lb (111 kg). It features a cantilever mid-wing, pod-and-boom layout, a V-tail, a single-seat, open cockpit, tricycle landing gear and a single engine in pusher configuration.

The aircraft has unusual construction. The fuselage pod is made from gas tungsten arc welded aluminum tubing and composite, attached to a partially double-sleeved aluminum irrigation pipe. Its 31 ft (9.4 m) span wing is constructed from wood, with foam ribs and one third span ailerons. The V-tail is all-flying and is made from foam ribs glued to the aluminum tubular spar. The flying surfaces are covered in either Mylar or doped aircraft fabric covering. On early models the control system is two-axis, all controlled by the control stick, while later ones incorporate rudder pedals.

The standard powerplant supplied was a Yamaha engine of 14 hp (10 kW) which provides the Invader with a cruise speed of 40 mph (64 km/h), but limits the ceiling to 4,000 ft (1,219 m). The very aerodynamically clean design produces a glide ratio of 14:1.

== Operational history ==
In operational service the aircraft proved to have problems with the ribs deteriorating and separating from the spar after only four years, even when the aircraft was stored indoors. This problem has affected used aircraft prices, as most surviving examples require repairs.

== Variants ==
Invader Mk II
Conventional landing gear model.
Invader Mk III
Tricycle landing gear model.

== Specifications (Invader Mk III) ==
Data from Cliche and the Virtual Ultralight Museum

General characteristics

- Crew: one
- Length: 18 ft (5.5 m)
- Wingspan: 31 ft (9.4 m)
- Height: 4 ft (1.2 m)
- Wing area: 140 sq ft (13 m^{2})
- Empty weight: 245 lb (111 kg)
- Gross weight: 475 lb (215 kg)
- Fuel capacity: 2.5 U.S. gallons (9.5 L; 2.1 imp gal)
- Powerplant: 1 × Yamaha , 14 hp (10 kW)

Performance

- Cruise speed: 40 mph (64 km/h, 35 kn)
- Stall speed: 20 mph (32 km/h, 17 kn)
- Range: 100 mi (160 km, 87 nmi)
- Service ceiling: 4,000 ft (1,200 m)
- g limits: +4/-4
- Maximum glide ratio: 14:1
- Rate of climb: 500 ft/min (2.5 m/s)
