= List of Majin Bone episodes =

The Majin Bone anime series premiered on April 1, 2014. Episodes are simulcast with English, Spanish, and Portuguese subs on Crunchyroll to people in the United States, Canada, South Africa, Australia, New Zealand, and Latin America (Central & South America including Mexico).

== Music ==
Opening themes

- "Legend is Born" by Kazuki Katou (eps. 1–30)
- "Sensation Signal" by Glutamine (eps. 31–52)

Ending themes

- "OKAN GOMEN" by Misoshiru's (eps. 1–13)
- "Blue Destiny" by Koyuki Takeno (eps. 14–40)
- "Ripumi" by LUI FRONTiC Akabane JAPAN (eps. 41–52)

== Episode list ==
No.	Title	Original release date
1	"Visitors from the Darkness"; Transliteration: "Yami kara no Hōmonsha" (Japanese: 闇からの訪問者)	April 1, 2014
Mysterious holes begin appearing all over the Earth. People blame it on the weather, but we see seven mysterious fighters fighting at the site in a different dimension. The next morning teenager Ryuujin Shougo learns about the strange holes when getting ready for Earth. That evening he is outside when the ground collapses at his friends house. Shougo goes to investigate only to find a mysterious card. He gets attacked by one of the unknown figures, but then the card transforms him into a fighter known as Dragon Bone.
2	"Chosen Warrior"; Transliteration: "Eraba Reshi Senshi" (Japanese: 選ばれし戦士)	April 8, 2014
After transforming into Dragon Bone, Shougo gets transported to an alternate dimension where he fights the deadly Dark Scorpion. Three unknown strangers protect him from being defeated. The next morning Shougo awakes to find that Saho Shimatani's family has moved in with them after their house was destroyed. Shougo tries to describe what happened, but no one believes him. Later in the day Shougo gets approached by strangers who want him to join them in protecting the Earth, but do they have a more sinister purpose? Can Shougo trust them?
3	"Rejection of Bone"; Transliteration: "Bōn no Kyozetsu" (Japanese: ボーンの拒絶)	April 15, 2014
After watching Shougo get a bone crush in one kick on Dark Spider, the three men: Antonio, Luke, and Tyrone reveal that Shougo is being attacked by the Dark Bones. They reveal that Dark Bones are trying to steal all the Bones from the Earth, and if they succeed they could destroy the world. Shougo debates whether or not to accept their words, but when the time comes for his next fight he finds himself unable to transform for some unknown reason. Tyrone is forced to transform into Rhino, Luke into Shark, and Antonio into Jaguar to face off with Dark Scorpion, Dark Spider, and Dark Beetle.
4	"Warrior's Resolution"; Transliteration: "Senshi no Kakugo" (Japanese: 戦士の覚悟)	April 22, 2014
Shougo learns his will and Dragon Bones wills aren't resonating. If he can't figure out how to make his will resonate, he learns that Luke has orders to kill him so they can find someone else to use Dragon Bone. When the Dark Bones return again and target some of Shougo's family, he makes up his mind on whether or not to battle. Which way will he decide, and which Dark Bones appear to give the Dark Bones greater strength? Shougo also hears Dark Horse speak for the first time.
5	"Majin Descends"; Transliteration: "Majin Kōrin" (Japanese: 魔神降臨)	April 29, 2014
The fourth bone adept, Gilbert from America, arrives in Japan. He believes himself to be the strongest of the bone adepts because he chose to become a bone and refuses to fight with anyone who doesn't share his resolve when it comes to protecting the world. When Dark Scorpion, Dark Spider, Dark Bee, and Dark Beetle appear he thinks he has a chance to prove himself. As Leo he is able to fight evenly with Dark Bee and Dark Beetle while Jaguar takes on Dark Spider. Dark Horse enters the fray and proves to be too much for Leo, forcing the others to run to his assistance. It allows Spider, Bee, and Beetle to line up and summon a Majin, giving themselves additional speed and strength. After thoroughly defeating our five heroes, Horse declares that they've only given them a taste on this day, and they vow to return to finish the job later.
6	"Believe in Yourself"; Transliteration: "Jibun o Shinjite" (Japanese: 自分を信じて)	May 6, 2014
Gilbert gets Shougo to train him on kicks while Luke tries to get permission to form a line. Gilbert's attitude bothers his teammates, causing the Dark Bones to attack. Leo tries to get revenge against Horse but is easily defeated. Dragon agrees to fight Horse, and when he refuses to give up he powers up. Luke decides to ignore his superiors instructions and as Shark he forms a line with Jaguar and Dragon. They summon the Fire Majin, forcing Horse to retreat while Spider, Bee, and Beetle line up and summon the Water Majin.
7	"Bone Research Facility"; Transliteration: "Bōn Kenkyūjo" (Japanese: ボーン研究所)	May 13, 2014
The Majin powers up Dragon and allows him to become stronger than Bee and Spider, both of whom attack him. Dragon's kicks and punches manage to fossilize Bee completely, and when he comes out of the armor he looks like a human. With Bee having been defeated, the Water Majin is banished from the field, and the Dark Bones retreat. The group battles to Melbourne to get Dragon repaired. They point out that Shougo's energy level also suggests that the Dark Bone adept must be fine. The director then shocks them all by revealing the Dark Bones are of extraterrestrial origin even though they look human. Two mysterious dark figures are then seen approaching the Bone Research Facility.
8	"Invaders"; Transliteration: "Shinnyūsha" (Japanese: 侵入者)	May 20, 2014
Shougo decides that Dragon will only cause problems if it is out in the opening. He vows not to fight anymore when Luke forces him into the simulcastion center. Instead of fighting Shougo as Shark, he has the Professor use the Scorpion card he has recovered. Shougo learns that only by fighting can he protect his friends, family, and allies. Before he can vow to help though the two strangers break into the Bone Research Facility, placing it on Red Level. When they reach the repair room they get cut off by the Bone adepts, but the two pul out their own bone cards and transform. Seeing no other choice Luke transports all those with active bones to the Revelation Cocoon to battle.
9	"Fierce Resonance"; Transliteration: "Hageshii kyōmei" (Japanese: 激しい共鳴)	May 27, 2014
The two mystery fighters are revealed to be Victor and Gregory. They aren't alien warriors. Instead they have lost faith in the Earth and wish to turn the Dragon card over to the people of Nepo Anegelis, or the Dark Bone Warriors. The two equip the Tiger Bone and the Wolf Bone and do battle with the White Bone Warriors. When they begin to handle Shark, Leo, Jaguar, and Rhino with relative ease, Shougo starts punching at the container holding Dragon Bone. Extreme Resonance occurs, fulling healing Dragon Bone allowing him to equip it and go to help his friends. When The Professor successfully starts scanning the Tiger and Wolf Bones, Victor and Gregory decide to retreat and target Dragon at another time.
10	"A Daily Life Worth Protecting"; Transliteration: "Mamoritai nichijō" (Japanese: 守りたい日常)	June 3, 2014
The group returns to Japan with the repaired Dragon. Saho tries to figure out why Shougo has been changing while Gilbert gets upset at Shougo for getting back to his casual daily life too fast. When the Dark Bones attack, Shougo reveals his resolve to protect his daily life at all costs. He bone crushes the Dark Mantis and Dark Beetle in one hit, and Dark Horse vows to return even stronger.
11	"The Primordial Majin"; Transliteration: "Hajimari no majin" (Japanese: 始まりの魔神)	June 10, 2014
Gilbert throws himself into training to try to get rid of the feeling that he was fighting half-heartedly. Meanwhile Dark Horse, panicked by the rapid skill improvement of Dragon, makes preparations for what he believes will be the final battle with Dragon. Dark Horse attacks with Dark Spider and goes berserk. Leo and Rhino distract Spider while the others form a line and summon the Fire Majin. Dark Horse then sacrifices Dark Spider, letting his be bone crushed, to cause Dragon to lose his right arm. Before he can charge to try and finish them, an immense presence begins to fill the Earth. As the title indicates, The Primordial Majin is about to make his debut. He willingly sacrifices Dark Horse and crushes the Revelation Cocoon to bring the others out of their bone states.
12	"Dragon's Rampage"; Transliteration: "Doragon no bōsō" (Japanese: ドラゴンの暴走)	June 17, 2014
With the Revelation Cocoon destroyed, Liebert decides to grab the Dragon Bone from Shougo. She equips the Dark Panther bone and attacks. Without the Revelation Cocoon Earth's heroes can't move and fight normally. Liebert is able to handle all of them, and when things are their grimmest Shougo once again hears Dragon Bone's voice. Dragon Bone agrees to give him all of his power, but warns Shougo that he'll be consumed in his current state. Shougo disregards the warning, and with the additional power he goes berserk and is able to chase off Dark Panther. However he falls unconscious at the end of the battle, and more land catastrophes occur because of their fight.
13	"True Strength"; Transliteration: "Honmono no tsuyosa" (Japanese: 本物の強さ)	June 24, 2014
An unconscious Shougo is rushed to the hospital where Luke vows to protect him at all costs. Liebert returns to try and steal Dragon's bone card. Luke uses a new control device to open the Revelation Cocoon, allowing them to fight Panther at full power. Panther once again seems to have the upper hand. In Shougo's mind he reveals to Dragon there is a power more powerful than anger that they can unlock if they work together. Dragon eventually gives in, allowing Shougo to regain consciousness. Shougo awakens and enters the battle. He is able to read Panther's movements with ease and manages to fossilize her left hand and shoulder before Liebert decides to withdraw.
14	"Shark's Rampage"; Transliteration: "Shāku no bōsō" (Japanese: シャークの暴走)	July 1, 2014
Luke tells the lab that feelings power a bone and cause them to be consumed. Later on Shougo reveals a bone can be controlled and powered up if the adepts learn to communicate with it. Luke hesitates listening to these words and leaves off on his own. It is revealed that Luke is the director of the Los Angeles Institute's son and that he feels additional pressure to help his father be successful. Meanwhile two new Dark Bones appear, Morse and Gustos- also known as Dark Bear and Dark Grizzly. They vow to get revenge for Liebert, but when they get pushed into a fight Luke ends up going berserk. Can anyone calm him down enough?
15	"Shaken Destiny"; Transliteration: "Yureru unmei" (Japanese: ゆれる運命)	July 8, 2014
After becoming an adept when he was a kid, we learn Luke and his Father began to drift apart. Now they rarely see or speak to each other. Lenard worries that Luke will go berserk intentionally, and the other adepts wonder why Luke is feeling so depressed. During a summer cleaning spree, Luke is counseled by Shougo's father to trust in his allies a bit more often and he will really grow. Vyse is sent to Earth to claim the Dragon Bone as Dark Eagle. Thanks to the words of Shougo's father, Luke and Shark Bone are finally able to communicate. Dragon, Shark, and Rhino form a line and summon the Water Majin to help in their battle. With his power they defeat Dark Eagle. After seeing Luke's resolve, Leonard decides to head back to the lab and reveals that the elemental Majins are neutral to whom they help.
16	"Will of Steel"; Transliteration: "Hagane no seishin" (Japanese: 鋼の精神)	July 15, 2014
Gilbert begins to feel restless after watching Luke summon the Water Majin. He refuses to trust the others and decides to run to try and vent his frustrations. During one such run he gets unexpected company when Saho shows up. Saho tells Gilbert about her dreams and ambitions, and he agrees to help her with trigonometry. Afterwards Gilbert and Saho talk about how they are feeling left behind, but just as Gilbert starts to gain more confidence Victor and Gregory return and start dominating a battle. Leo remembers the words that he's been given and starts to resonate with his bone. Jaguar, Leo, and Rhino form a line and the Majin of Thunder is summoned. With his help Leo is able to distract Victor and Gregory, but it isn't until he communicates with his bone due to his unwavering fighting spirit that Leo's true strength is revealed.
17	"Gentle Big Brother"; Transliteration: "Yasashii ani" (Japanese: 優しい兄)	July 22, 2014
After defeating Victor and Gregory, Leo's card becomes fossilized preventing Gilbert from being able to fight. Liebert, Morse, and Gustos are allowed to go to Earth where they learn their bones have animals that look very familiar to their bones. The three engage our heroes and quickly form a diagonal line allowing Dark Panther to summon the Majin of Space. Rhino realizes he can't hear their voices because they are too stubborn and starts to resonate with his bone. While Shark keeps Dark Panther engaged Dragon, Rhino, and Jaguar form a side-to-side line and Rhino summons the Majin of Earth. Tyrone tries to convince them to leave without further engagement, but it proves to be futile. Tyrone manages to reflect Dark Panthers power back on her and fossilizes her arm, so Grizzly and Bear attack Rhino. He manages to reflect their attack and fossilize both of their cards completely, but in the process his own arms become fossilized as well.
18	"Stray Cats and Stray Dogs"; Transliteration: "Noraneko to norainu" (Japanese: 野良猫と野良犬)	July 29, 2014
Antonio increases his workload but does it at an easy pace, telling everyone he'll be able to summon a Majin when it is needed. Shougo asks Antonio how he became an adept. We learn Antonio was a thief in a slum city, but when he tried to still a case from Luke it proved to be the changing of his destiny. Victor and Gregory attack before he can finish his story. Instead of focusing on the battle, Antonio tries to learn why these two betrayed the Earth. When he comes to the conclusion that he'll be stronger than them because of the friends he has gained, Antonio's bone begins to resonate. Dragon, Jaguar, and Shark form the line, and the Majin of Wood is summoned. With the Majin's help, Antonio is able to match the movements of Tiger and Wolf. Before he can finish them though, three new Dark Bone warriors arrive, appearing to be stronger than any they have previously seen.
19	"Iron Bone"; Transliteration: "Aianbōn" (Japanese: アイアンボーン)	August 5, 2014
The three strangers that have arrived end up being Klude, Drossas, and Vyse as Dark Wyvern, Dark Alligator, and Dark Eagle. They attack Shark and Dragon allowing Antonio to be targeted three-on-one by the others. When Shougo attacks Lord Klude (Dark Wyvern), Dragon warns him to flee saying he can't beat him as he is now. Klude fossilizes Dragon's legs with one hit and then fossilizes Jaguar and Shark completely with a single hit. Klude then reveals he is an iron bone and that no white bone has any chance of beating him. When Victor and Gregory come out to taunt Gilbert by declaring this is the end of the world, Gilbert declares it will only truly be the end if they give up. Gilbert's attitude leads him to revitalize Leo with fierce resonance. Leo Bone communicates with Gilbert and reveals he saw the Earth formed and has seen every moment of Gilbert's life. He reveals Gilbert doesn't know much of the Earth, but Gilbert declares he will learn of it later. Leo then evolves into Iron Leo. Leo then takes the Shark and Jaguar cards back, and Drossas remembers the words of Liebert in saying don't underestimate the Earthlings.
20	"The Shadow of the Traitor"; Transliteration: "Uragirimono no kage" (Japanese: 裏切者の影)	August 12, 2014
The adepts return to Melbourne so research can be done on the bones now that they can all summon Majins. They also wish to see what cause Leo Bone to evolve and research the new fossilized Dark Bones. Leonard vows to reveal how to evolve the bones scientifically, causing everyone to decide to leave him alone. Drossas convinces Victor and Gregory to head to Melbourne to claim the Dragon Bone and keep his bone from being confiscated. While the bones are being rejuvenated Luke and Shougo head to the sauna. Luke informs Shougo that his weakness right now is his temper and that he must overcome it. Drossas manages to take down the guard system and seals Leo Bone in a cage. Tyrone and Shougo equip to go battle the enemy. Dark Alligator handles them with relative ease and reveals that all of them are White Bones, just like the Earthlings. Leonard manages to release the lock, and Gilbert equips Iron Leo. Gilbert makes the save. Alligator submerges and claims his real battle experience will lead him to victory, but Leo manages to predict his move and gets the victory. Afterwards Leonard reveals he thinks if he analyzes the battle data he will learn how to evolve all the bones into Iron Bones.
21	"Three of Iron"; Transliteration: "Santai no aian" (Japanese: 3体のアイアン)	August 19, 2014
Luke sends Antonio, Tyrone, and Shougo into town so they can see if they can find the spy at the research facility. While they are away Leonard reveals that Shark, Rhino, and Jaguar all have concentrated Majin particles in their bodies at specific points while Leo has them throughout his body. He believes that if those three can endure attacks from the enemy, they will unlock the iron evolution thanks to the ability to summon Majins. Shortly thereafter Drossas and Vyse attack the trio in town. Luckily Luke had been on his way to pick them up. The three endure their attacks and all transform into iron bones. Now only Dragon is left to evolve, but before the team can return to the lab Shougo gets separated from them and is brought face-to-face with Klude.
22	"Dragon's Awakening"; Transliteration: "Doragon no kakusei" (Japanese: ドラゴンの覚醒)	August 26, 2014
Klude reveals the history of how Dragon came to Earth to Shougo. Antonio, Tyrone, and Luke find Shougo and realize he's talking to one of the Dark Bones. They prepare to fight Klude, but instead he backs off and says he will return to talk to Dragon later. Leonard does his best to try to find Dragon's core bone, but without any data before Dragon summoned a Majin he finds himself in the dark. The adepts then sense they are about to be attacked. They go outside and battle Dark Eagle, Dark Alligator, and Dark Wyvern. Rhino distracts Eagle while Leo distracts Alligator, allowing them to summon the Fire Majin. Wyvern quickly pulls a bone break on Dragon's right hand and thinks he knocks Shougo unconscious. He uses this brief moment to speak to Dragon only to learn that Shougo has been influencing his people and his influence is why Dragon chose him as his adept. Shougo stands back up and throws a punch with his fossilized right arm. The others realize that Dragon's right arm is his core bone. With the arm freed again, Shougo becomes Iron Dragon and does enough damage that Wyvern is forced to leave the Earth with his team for a moment of time.
23	"Family Portrait"; Transliteration: "Kazoku no shōzō" (Japanese: 家族の肖像)	September 2, 2014
Shougo attacks a man he believes to be an enemy in disguise. It ends up being Saho's father, and he has just returned from Argentina. Saho isn't the only one having family visit. Stolz, also known as Dark Phoenix, visits Klude to discuss his daughter, Liebert, and her attitude change. He comes with Gladis, who is Dark Swordfish. With her father present, Saho decides she wants to go to the water park to celebrate the end of summer. There they learn Antonio is a lifeguard, and all the adepts, as well as her parents, are present. Just as the group begins to have fin Dark Bat, also known as Freyd, sends Dark Swordfish down. He attacks the park with no purpose. Shark and Dragon rush to face him while the others evacuate the innocents. During the battle Swordfish reveals Klude isn't in charge and there is someone above all of them who could cause a lot more trouble for everyone involved.
24	"Unstoppable Urge"; Transliteration: "Tomaranai shōdō" (Japanese: とまらない衝動)	September 9, 2014
Klude returns the Panther Bone to Liebert and informs her that she is to go to the Earth and not only claim the Dragon Bone but learn as much as possible about why the Bones are resiting the Primordial Majin. Shougo is fighting at a karate exhibit and makes it past the first round. Liebert sees Saho come out of the exhibit hall and decides to look around for Dragon. Meanwhile Morse and Gutos determine they will make Saho a hostage, but they find their mission deterred when Saho offers them food. Liebert eventually finds Shougo and accepts a challenge to a karate match against him. Surprisingly Liebert wins the karate contest, but she is shocked to learn that karate isn't a training for fighting. Instead it's a training that makes one more healthy and strong. She activates her bone refusing to accept the possibility that protecting someone could make a person stronger than your own belief, but Shougo, as Dragon, nails her with one punch and almost knocks her unconscious. The two agree to call it a draw and Liebert announces she won't leave Earth until she has claimed the Dragon Bone.
25	"Cerberus"; Transliteration: "Keruberosu" (Japanese: ケルベロス)	September 16, 2014
Revolt, known as Dark Cerberus, begins the episode by destroying an entire planet to gain one bone. Victor and Gregory come down to Earth where they return Bear and Grizzly to Morse and Gustos on one condition- they form a line with the two of them that will involve five bones. Victor and Greogory eventually find Shougo and reveal that if Dragon Bone is taken away, Earth will be destroyed because Dragon Bone is the keystone bone for the planet Earth. The group then targets Shougo where the two lines summon the Majin of Thunder and the Majin of Wind, powering up Tiger and Wolf. The move proves to be futile as Jaguar and Leo each manage to fossilize one of Tiger and Wolf's arms, causing the group of five to withdraw. However Liebert begins to think on all the details Shougo has told her and wonders if they should be fighting. Off the planet Cerberus has called together the Council of Elders and discusses the limited success of the invasion of Earth but is countered by Klude pointing out the Majin doesn't wish for meaningless slaughter when one recovers a bone, like Cerberus made occur when he was recovering Griffon Bone. Cerberus is given permission to take over the invasion on Earth, and Luke reveals that Director Higashio is the labs traitor because he is the only one who can remove cards from inside the lab. Meanwhile Higashio has arrived at Shougo's dojo and is talking with Tyrone.
26	"The Brothers' Past"; Transliteration: "Kyōdai no Kako" (Japanese: 兄弟の過去)	September 23, 2014
Tyrone leads Director Higashio away from Shougo's house, and he gets surrounded by the adepts. Higashio reveals that Luke's theory is slightly flawed. he isn't working with the aliens. Instead he is working with Victor and Gregory. Higashio reveals how Victor and Gregory were betrayed by their hometown and how he saved their lives. At an archaeological site they were introduced to the bones, and when the Tiger and Wolf Bones responded for them Dark Scorpion arrived. The two willingly agreed to leave to gain the power Dark Scorpion had. Three years later they returned, the same day the Director found Leo. The Director said he would show them the hope of the world in exchange for two debts being repaid, because he had saved each of their lives. Victor and Gregory appear and announce those debts had been repaid, shocking all the adepts present. The first time was when they left behind the knife containing data on how to defossilize Dragon. The second was showing them how to unlock iron. Just then Swordfish attacks. The adepts, minus Luke, rush to do battle. Swordfish takes on Leo, Rhino, and Jaguar while Shougo tries to make Victor and Gregory realize that by forgetting others, they are making other people suffer the same agony they suffered. Dragon Bone gets severely injured by Victor and Gregory, and the episode ends with Swordfish aiming a sword strike at Dragon that could fossilize him completely.
27	"Stirring Ambition"; Transliteration: "Ugokidashita yabō" (Japanese: 動きだした野望)	September 30, 2014
Just before Swordfish can finish off Dragon, Tiger and Wolf jump in the way and take heavy pressure to their core bones. The two transform into Iron Wolf and Iron Tiger and are able to defeat Swordfish and cause him to withdraw. Afterwards they confront Dragon and tell him he can't see beyond his own world. They won't openly work against the Earth from here on out, but they will side only with the winner. Gladis returns and vows to Cerberus to come up with a plan to deal with Victor and Gregory, but Cerberus informs him not to fret because he has things in control. Cerberus has placed Klude on house arrest, removed Drossas and Vyse from power, and removed Klude's bone from him. When Victor and Gregory learn of this development, they volunteer to go find out more details for Liebert. Luke calls his father to tell him about Higashio's development only to learn all the higher-ups knew about it. Higashio talks to Shougo to learn about the enemies change after talking to Shougo. Semiria (Dark Hawk), Ulurra (Dark Owl), and Swordfish then arrive to attack. They form a line and summon the Majin of Water, causing our heroes to form a line and summon the Majin of Fire. Dragon and Swordfish attack each other in their powered up states while Jaguar and Shark do battle with Hawk and Rhino and Leo do battle with Owl. The trio is shocked when our heroes do damage to all of them and force them to withdraw. The episode ends with Shoujo at a teacher-parent conference. It is revealed that his wishy-washy attitude is a big weakness but that his ability to think things through is becoming a huge strength. Shougo then begins to realize he too has changed since meeting the others. Shougo is then confronted by Liebert, but the two are in for a surprise when Higashio stops for one final visit. He didn't come solely for Victor and Gregory. He was hoping to meet someone from Nepos Angelis.
28	"Coup d'Etat"; Transliteration: "Kūdetā" (Japanese: クーデター)	October 7, 2014
Higashio agrees to provide support for the members from Nepos Angelis if they will help him research their bones. At first Liebert is hesitant, but when she tries some of Shougo's sisters curry she changes her mind. A research facility is set up in Tokyo overnight, and Dragon and Panther are the first two subjects. Meanwhile Victor and Gregory are spying on Nepos Angelis. They witness Cerberus in a duel with Phoenix and watch as Cerberus ends up the victor and walks away with the Phoenix bone. Victor and Gregory return and report to Liebert, and she vows to go reclaim her Father's bone. Realizing he cost Phoenix his bone, Shougo vows to go with her and help reclaim it, shocking everyone present.
29	"To Nepos!"; Transliteration: "Neposu e!" (Japanese: ネポスへ！)	October 14, 2014
Shougo convinces everyone to go to Nepos to free Liebert's father, Stolz. When they arrive they see the world is very much like Earth, but it has cars that fly, extinct animals that are tame, and people in complete harmony with nature. In the city Shougo recognizes the man that used to be Bee and confirms he is okay. However one of Cerberus's subordinates detects Liebert's return and reports to him. Cerberus decides to return the Phoenix Bone to Klude and make him deal with Liebert. Meanwhile the eight warriors encounter and battle it out with the Dark Kraken Bone. He causes all of their bones a high amount of damage, but teamwork allows them to crush his shoulder bone and escape with the win.
30	"Wyvern vs. Cerberus"; Transliteration: "Waibān VS keruberosu" (Japanese: ワイバーンVSケルベロス)	October 21, 2014
The adepts make it into Stolz's house where they a little of the training that takes place on Neos Apoelis. Lord Klude confronts Liebert and is ready to claim Dragon Bone until Liebert tells him that the Phoenix Bone has been stolen. Just then Cerberus arrives, ready to claim the Dragon Bone. All the adepts that have unfossilized bones transform to do battle, including Lord Klude, who has somehow reclaimed the Wyvern Bone. Klude fights Cerberus one-on-one and provides hints on how Liebert can find her father. Liebert forms a line and summons the Majin of Space. With his power they are able to find and free her father. Cerberus breaks free and starts to damage Dragon Bone, declaring with an ominous voice that he will now have them all. However Klude summons the Majin of Fire by himself and merges with him, becoming Rare Metal Wyvern. His final attack allows Liebert to transport all of Earth's adepts out of the cocoon, but even in Rare Metal form Wyvern is unable to defeat Cerberus. At the end Stolz and Klude are taken to safety by Morse and Gustos, Liebert appears to have transported the others back to Earth, and Victor and Gregory continue to spy secretly on Cerberus.
31	"Aid From Space"; Transliteration: "Sora kara no tasuke" (Japanese: 宇宙からの助け)	October 28, 2014
The team is revealed to be in Los Angeles instead of Sydney. Shougo and the rest of the team finally meet Luke's father. He reveals a new cocoon is being made that can withstand the stronger powers the adepts have developed, but until it is completed he forbids any of them to leave. When the Neposians attack the adepts are forced to fight without the cocoon, but they forbid Shougo from equipping. Finally the cocoon is completed, and Shougo battles the Neopsians by himself in it. At the end of the battle Shougo learns that the cocoon maker is none of than his long lost mother.
32	"The Truth of 12 Years Ago"; Transliteration: "Jūni nen mae no shinjitsu" (Japanese: 12年前の真実)	November 4, 2014
Shougo finally learns why his mother left him and the family. Now he must decide whether or not to accept reuniting with her.
33	"Being A Family"; Transliteration: "Kazoku de aru koto" (Japanese: 家族であること)	November 11, 2014
Shougo must decide whether or not to tell his father and sister that he knows where their mother/wife is now at.
34	"Ouroboros Descends"; Transliteration: "Uroborosu kōrin" (Japanese: ウロボロス降臨)	November 18, 2014
Panther decides to return to Nepos Angelis to help her father and Klude. Meanwhile Victor and Gregory decide to return to Earth and capture Dragon Bone. When Panther arrives on Nepos Angelis she is forced to withdraw her father and friends from the planet, because she learns the Council members have finally gotten involved in the conflict. She reveals the council now as their eyes on Earth.
35	"Pride of the Eques"; Transliteration: "Eku-esu no hokori" (Japanese: エクェスの誇り)	November 25, 2014
Klude begins to learn what Earthlings are really like when Shougo and the other adepts enter the cocoon to protect Stolz, Klude, Victor, and Gregory from Ouroboros and Owl. When all the adepts except Dragon get bone crushed Klude and Panther enter the cocoon to provide assistance. However Phoenix is partially fossilized and can't use his full power. As Ouroboros begins to unleash his full power on Phoenix, Phoenix's eyes begin to glow. Could he be about to go Rare Metal once more?
36	"Rare Metal Bone"; Transliteration: "Rea metaru bōn" (Japanese: レアメタルボーン)	December 2, 2014
Wyvern & Dragon battle Owl and Ouroboros. Wayvern finds one of the traps and uses it to ambush Ouroboros, but when Owl stops time and fossilizes most of Wyvern Bone Klude is left with nothing but hope and desire. Seeing Dragon is about to be destroyed, Klude calls out to the Fire Majin and asks him to assist Dragon. Surprisingly Klude's call is answered, though Wyvern Bone is destroyed in the process. The Fire Majin merges with Dragon turning Dragon into a Rare Metal Bone. With the new power Dragon is able to defeat Owl and force Ourobors to retreat. After the battle Klude, Stolz, Victor, and Gregory return Nepolis Angelis to keep too many council members from coming to Earth and research begins anew on Dragon's new capabilities.
37	"The Mystery of Rare Metal"; Transliteration: "Rea metaru no nazo" (Japanese: レアメタルの謎)	December 9, 2014
Leonard tries to uncover the mystery of Rare Metal bones, but he can't find any difference in Dragon Bone from when it became an iron bone. On Nepos the council debates whether or not Lord Stolz and Lord Klude are following the Primordial Majin's will, and they decide the only way to learn for certain is by capturing them. One of Socius's subordinates is sent to Earth to bring those two back to Nepos, not knowing they are already back on Nepos. When he arrives on Earth Shougo and Liebert intercept him and head into battle with only one side expected to prevail.
38	"As a Warrior of Nepos"; Transliteration: "Neposu no senshi toshite" (Japanese: ネポスの戦士として)	December 16, 2014
Revolt gives Vyse the right arm of Griffin and sends him to Earth with one last chance to capture Dragon Bone. However it is all part of a plan. Revolt plans to take control of Griffin fully during the fight and destroy Vyse once and for all. Drossas learns the truth and heads to Earth to try and save his friend, but Griffin has already overpowered him. Now Drossas must decide which is more important: capturing Dragon Bone or saving his friend. One will bring him fame and fortune. The other could make him appear as a traitor, but it maybe the only way to save Vyse.
39	"Cerberus, to Earth!"; Transliteration: "Keruberosu, chikyū e!" (Japanese: ケルベロス、地球へ！)	December 23, 2014
Christmas has arrived, and out heroes decide to take a day to celebrate. The celebration is shortly lived though. Revolt heads to Earth. He equips his Cerberus bone and then equips the legs of Griffon on top of it. Cerberus quickly overpowers all the bones except Rhino and Dragon. Rhino uses his horn to draw all of Cerberus's lightning attacks into the ground, acting as a buffer. Eventually Rhino Bone's power gives out and he almost completely fossilizes. However Shougo is assisted by the Majin of Fire once more and becomes Rare Metal Dragon. Rare Metal Dragon battles Cerberus evenly until two members of the council force Revolt to be called back to Nepos Angelis. However damage has been done. If Rhino goes into one more battle, he could likely be destroyed forever unless they can find a way to restore him.
40	"Melbourne Assault"; Transliteration: "Meruborun kyūshū" (Japanese: メルボルン急襲)	January 6, 2015
Victor and Gregory return to Earth and arrive at the Melbourne lab. They wish to not only capture Dragon Bone but gather all research on rare metal forms, hoping they can utilize that power on their own. When they arrive the Director goes out to meet them, knowing they can't equip their bones until they pass a certain defense line. The two distract the director and then are able to enter the facility. The Bone adepts, minus Tyrone, equip their bones. Victor and Gregory seem to have the advantage, but then Luke gets ticked and summons the Majin of Water. He powers up strniger than ever before and is able to fossilize part's of Wolf and Tiger, forcing Victor and Gregory to retreat from the cocoon. Before the adepts can exit the cocoon though, Victor and Gregory make their way to the center of the base. They steal all the bone research on rare metals and decide to destroy the base so the new cocoon they saw in the drawings cannot be made.
41	"The Road Taken, the Road You Must See"; Transliteration: "Ayunde kita michi, ayumu beki michi" (Japanese: 歩んで来た道, 歩むべき道)	January 13, 2015
This episode serves as a recap of the previous 40 episodes. telling the story of how Shougo becomes Dragon Bone, how the Majins first appear, how Earth is targeted, and much more. At the end a quick preview of Rare Metal Dragon is shown with the tease that Shougo will soon master this power, changing the tide of all the battles on Earth
42	"Calm Fury"; Transliteration: "Shizuka naru gekijō" (Japanese: 静かなる激情)	January 20, 2015
All research is moved to the Los Angeles lab, but the lack of bone facilities makes it hard for them to unfossilize Rhino. On Nepos the council votes to place Revolt in charge despite hearing that he has used the Griffon Bone and gone to Earth on his own accord. A new member of the council offers his services to Revolt and comes to Earth to do battle. He equips the dangerous Basilisk bone and summons illusions of all the fallen dark bone warriors. With the illusions he is able to cause severe damage to Jaguar, Leo, and Dragon. As things appear at their grimmest Rhino Bone disappears from the lab and equips itself to Tyrone. Tyrone hears Rhino's voice for the first time, and as he enters the cocoon the Majin of Earth appears and grants him his power. Tyrone becomes Rare Metal Rhino and disposes of the illusions that have been summoned. He then uses his new power to create a reflective coat that throws all of Bat's attacks back at him and fossilizes the Bat bone permanently. Rhino bone recovers fully, and Revolt is forced to make new plans as he learns he will now have two rare metal forms to deal with.
43	"Changing Despair into Hope"; Transliteration: "Zetsubō o kibō ni kaete" (Japanese: 絶望を希望に変えて)	January 27, 2015
Director Higashio arrives in Los Angeles and reveals that everything in Melbourne was lost except for one personal matter. He gives it to Luke, revealing it's a picture of the original Melbourne training team. Elsewhere on the base Leonard is going crazy trying to unlock the mystery of the Majin Bone. Shougo's mother comes on and asks Leonard if he has unlocked anything. She reveals that when they complete the final form of the cocoon, she will be able to go home. Luke travels outside and is investigating the surrounding area. When Director Higashio calls him and he hangs up on him, Director Higashio realizes that Victor and Gregory have returned and must be trying a sneak attack. Luke seeks them out, and the three enter the cocoon to battle. Victor and Gregory reveal to Shark that the Cocoon wasn't created to help bones move freely. Instead it has another purpose. With their distraction planted, the two are nearly able to fossilize Shark. However their plan backfires when the Majin of Water does an original manifest. By combining with the Majin Bone Shark becomes Rare Metal Shark and is able to fossilize Wolf and force him out of the cocoon. Tiger recovers his brothers bone and makes a quick evac. On Nepos Revolt realizes with three Majin's siding with Earth that the Primordial Majin might have changed his will. He decides the only way to keep himself from being destroyed is by mastering the powers of the Phoenix Bone. Back on Earth Leonard goes all mad scientist on Shark Bone, and Ian reveals that they will now not only need to protect Dragon but also protect the Cocoon. He reveals that only the highest ranked people in the lab know this, but the Cocoon's real purpose is to create a new communication device with the Primordial Majin.
44	"Majin, Once More"; Transliteration: "Majin, futatabi" (Japanese: 魔神, 再び)	February 3, 2015
The true purpose of the Cocoon is revealed to communicate with the Primordial Majin. Once the Cocoon is completed and communication with the Primordial Majin can be achieved, then Chie can come back to Earth. A new Cocoon is given to Luke that will allow the group to maintain Rare Metal status easier, but it could also have unexpected side effects because it isn't the final form. The Nepos once again decide to attack Earth, and Earth's warriors equip their bones. While they are battling though the Primordial Majin himself appears. Everyone on the Earth is able to see part of the Primordial Majin. When he descends all bones except Dragon Bone suffer Bone Crushes. Shortly afterwards the Majins of Fire, Water, and Earth appear and converse with the Primordial Majin. It is revealed that the Majin's can adjust their sizes as necessary. Despite not hearing what the three say, the three manage to convince the Primordial Majin not to destroy Earth at this time.
45	"Wriggling Desires"; Transliteration: "Ugomeku Yokubō" (Japanese: 蠢く欲望)	February 10, 2015
Shougo learns that as a keybone he can converse with the Primordial Majin. As a result he decides to try and master rare metal bone and help finish the cocoon. Meanwhile on Nepos the members of the council fully take sides. Council members Pellebrand and Barlish meet up with Stolz and Klude and learn that Revolt has taken Phoenix Bone. They also learn that Revolt is supposed to be by himself that night, so a plan to regain control of Phoenix Bone is held. Pellebrand, Barlish, and Freeyd enter into battle with Socius, Raquelt, and Carvaleo. They are able to keep the Council members distracted, and when Revolt pulls out Phoenix Bone Freeyd, as Bat, is able to steal him. Bad news arrives shortly after as Stolz learns he cannot equip Phoenix Bone. Revolt equips Cerberus and then reveals he has devoured Phoenix Bone. The additional power of Phoenix Bone allows him to take on a new form. Wanting the others to be aware Freeyd transports Gustos and Morse to Earth, but it's at a tremendous cost. Pellebrand and Barlish get trapped in the in-space dimension, and Stolz and Klude appear to be killed.
46	"Unchanging Strength"; Transliteration: "Kawaranai tsuyosa" (Japanese: 変わらない強さ)	February 17, 2015
Gustos and Morse are transported back to Earth. They warn the team that Stolz and Klude appear to have been killed and that nothing will prevent the council from coming to Earth now. They also reveal that Revolt's true intention is to perform something called the "Joining of the End". On Nepos Revolt is happy to learn that all obstacles have been taken care of, and with the other three members of the council on board they decide to attack Earth. He reveals his plan is to free Nepos from the Primordial Majin by performing the Joining of the End, a forbidden technique which requires three key bones. He has two in his possession, but he reveals the third bone must be Dragon Bone as it is the corner bone for this technique. The Council decides to attack Earth and do all it takes to bring back Dragon Bone. Socius asks Revolt to stay behind in case the people learn he has devoured Phoenix Bone, knowing the people would rebel against them if their leader was sent into battle. The group travels to Earth and attacks. Liebert, Gustos, and Morse equip their bones to help Dragon Bone in the battle, and they are able to help distract the Council members while Antonio rushes to the location their bones are being repaired at. Jaguar Bone converses with Antonio for the first time and reveals that it was the Majin of Wood himself that asked Jaguar to teamup with Antonio. He also reveals it is time to take it up to the next level. Antonio equips his bone and makes it to the cocoon after Gustos and Morse have been defeated but before Dragon and Jaguar are. He becomes Rare Metal Jaguar for the first time, but before he can begin battling the council Liebert remembers having read about the Joining of the End. She decides to try and change the Council's minds as the episode ends.
47	"Forbidden Memory"; Transliteration: "Kindan no kioku" (Japanese: 禁断の記憶)	February 24, 2015
Jaguar shows more speed and power than ever before and manages to break parts of the Council's bones with ease. Seeing he may have some hidden powers causes Socius to retreat, and the other council members follow shortly. Shougo, Antonio, and Liebert come out of the cocoon, and Shobou thanks Liebert for saving all the many peoples lives with his transport ability. The group returns to the bone recovery site where Antonio admits he finally heard Jaguars voice. The group is informed by Director Higashio that Shark's, Rhino's, and Leo's bones have nearly recovered, and Liebert tells the group about a hidden chamber on Nepos where she read the words "joining of the end" and read it involves Phoenix and Dragon. Higashio ends up mentioning if they have any questions about the Primordial Majin then they should ask Shougo's mom. Back on Nepos Revolt announces the death of Stolz to the people. He informs them that he killed the murderous traitor Klude for them in revenge and that now the Primordial Majin has made him the main bone for Phoenix. On Earth Liebert takes Higashio's advice and transports to the space satellite Chie has been staying at. Chie manages to get Liebert to tell her the story of her mother and father and takes care of her like a mother would her own. When Chie hears about the council hall on Nepos she becomes determined to go investigate it. Chie is taken back to Earth by Liebert, and upon hearing her plan Higashio tells Shougo to go with them and protect his mother. All the group, minus Morse and Gustos, are transported to Nepos. The council senses their arrival and sends Socius to deal with them. Chie is led to the council hall, and the episode ends with Liebert leading everyone inside.
48	"Roar of Treason"; Transliteration: "Hangyaku no Otakebi" (Japanese: 反逆の雄叫び)	March 3, 2015
Our main heroes find their way into the secret alter that can communicate with the Primordial Majin. A surprise attack is waiting for them and they're dragged into battle. After some strategic fighting, Shougo finds himself confronting Revolt himself. Finally, his true goal is revealed, and it means the end of everything! What will happen to the universe if Revolts dream is realized? Does anybody stand a chance?
49	"Wolf and Tiger"; Transliteration: "Ookami to Tora" (Japanese: 狼と虎)	March 10, 2015
50	"The Joining of the End"; Transliteration: "Shūen no Musubi" (Japanese: 終焉の結び)	March 17, 2015
51	"The Beginning of the End"; Transliteration: "Owari no Hajimari" (Japanese: 終わりの始まり)	March 24, 2015
52	"Somewhere to Return"; Transliteration: "Kaerubeki Basho" (Japanese: 帰るべき場所)	March 31, 2015
