= Inwazja =

2019 Polish film

Inwazja ("Invasion") is a half-hour film directed by Przemysław Wenerski and Marcin Tulicki, produced by Telewizja Polska which purports to reveal "the inside story, aims, methods, and money behind the LGBT invasion" of Poland. It was first broadcast on 10 October 2019 ahead of the 2019 Polish parliamentary election two days later, shortly after the prime-time news show Wiadomości.

== Content ==
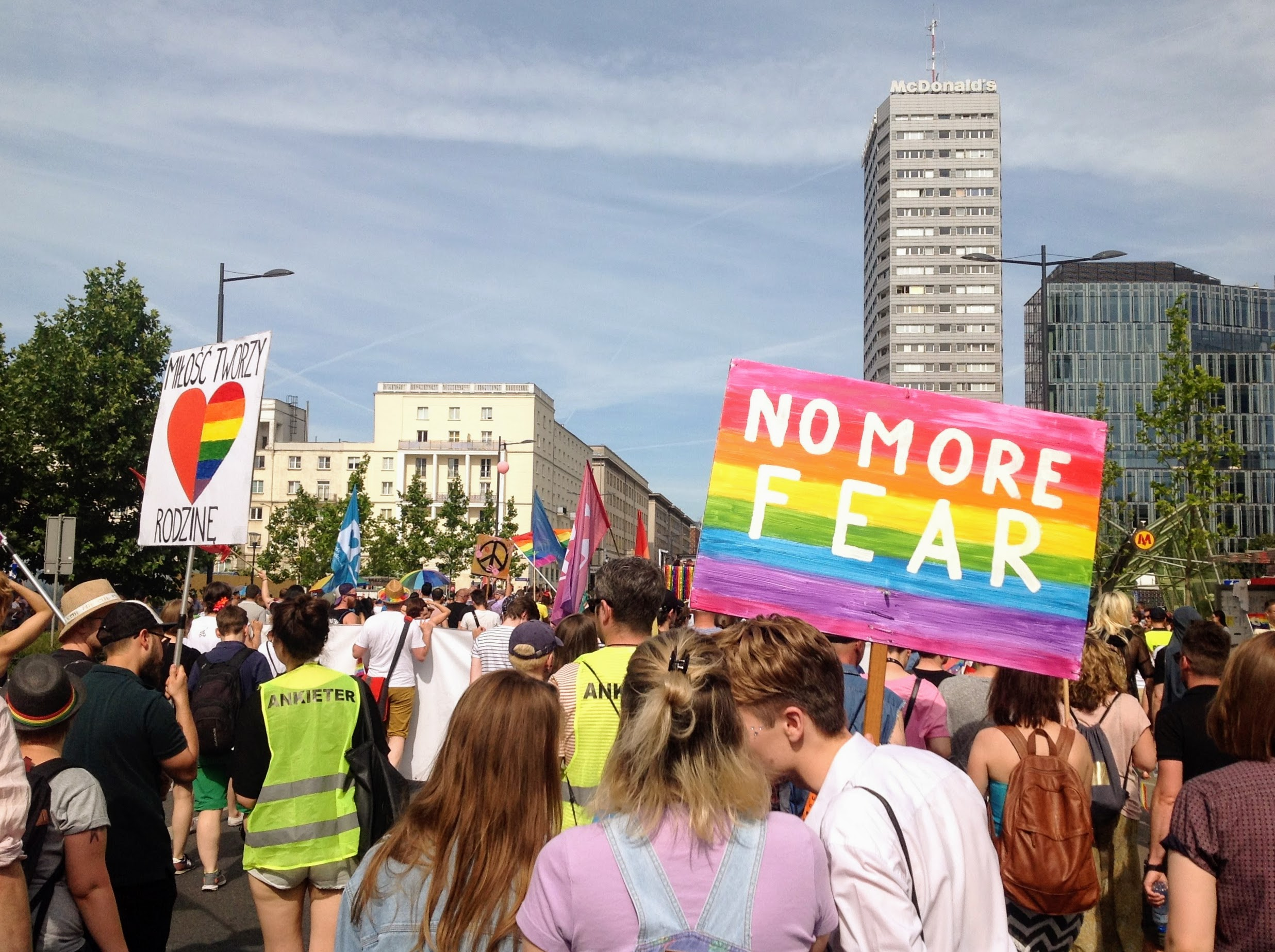
Warsaw Equality Parade in 2018. One of the participants holds a sign saying "Miłość tworzy rodzinę" ("Love makes a family").

According to Stanley Bill, the film "depicted LGBT rights activists as a foreign-backed threat to Polish children, religion, values, and the very biological continuation of the nation".

The film includes footage taken using a hidden camera by a TVP employee pretending to be a volunteer for Campaign Against Homophobia, a Polish LGBT organization. It implies that participants in equality marches in Poland were paid for their attendance. However, the reality is that only a handful of employees receive money to pay transportation expenses and other costs, who are not the vast majority of participants. The film claims that all equality marches in Poland are attended by the same protestors that travel to different towns. The film footage of equality marches in Poland and pride parades elsewhere is selected to portray the participants in the worst possible light. The film also omits important information about the equality marches, such as the violent attacks against them.

The purported "LGBT invasion" is described as different things, including: pedophilia, social engineering, a dangerous ideology, a controlled propaganda movement, desecration of the sacred, an attack on the Catholic Church, indoctrination of young people, nudity, vulgarity, changing customs. The independent media, local governments that support LGBT people, and mayors such as Rafał Trzaskowski and Jacek Jaśkowiak are portrayed as complicit in the "invasion". According to OKO.press, the film claims that the ultimate goal of the LGBT movement is to legalize pedophilia.

The film interviews different people for their reactions to the LGBT movement, including Aleksander Nalaskowski, Paweł Lisicki, and Bronisław Wildstein. Commentators compare the "LGBT invasion" to the Swedish Deluge and, unfavorably, to Stalinist rule in Poland. They also claim that the ultimate goal of the LGBT movement is legalization of pedophilia in Poland and that the LGBT movement is attacking the Catholic Church and its followers. Dawid Mysior, one of the commentators, says that Catholics "have the right to respond with aggression" to the LGBT movement.

== Reception ==
According to naTemat.pl, Inwazja is "generally considered homophobic". The film was especially controversial because it was produced by a public broadcaster which is funded by tax revenue. Hundreds of internet users reacted to the film by posting pictures of themselves with the hashtag #inwazjaLGBT.

Polish ombudsman Adam Bodnar stated that "The material not only reinforces stereotypes and intensifies social hatred towards LGBT people, but also manipulates facts." He added: "The aim of the authors of the material was to offend and exclude LGBT people by presenting them as different – an enemy and a source of dangers." He stated that the film did not meet journalistic standards as it did not follow the principles of pluralism, impartiality, and balance in reporting. In particular, he objected to the linkage of homosexuality and pedophilia. Bodnar appealed to the National Broadcasting Council to take action against the film.

Slava Melnyk, director of Campaign Against Homophobia, described the film as "homophobic and socially harmful libel". According to Bezprawnik, "it suffices to watch a few minutes of this film to realize that it was created only to further a homophobic campaign and use the situation of LGBT people for the current political struggle". According to Anton Ambroziak the film is a "collection of distortions and manipulations". He also called it a "homophobic pseudo-documentary" and a "propaganda film". Sociologist Ireneusz Krzemiński said he was "shocked by the perfidy of this film".

== Court ruling ==
Campaign Against Homophobia objected to the content of the film and asked TVP not to broadcast it, apologize, and either pay PLN 10,000 to the Lambda Warszawa hotline or else broadcast a spot supporting LGBT youth. Following a lawsuit brought by Campaign Against Homophobia for violation of its personal rights, in 2020, a court ruled that TVP had to remove the film from YouTube and not broadcast it for a year, although parts of the film are still available on the broadcaster's website. In a separate ruling, a court required TVP to disclose the production costs of the film after it refused a freedom of information request. Campaign Against Homophobia also raised money for lawsuits on behalf of some of the volunteers who were filmed without their consent, who say that the film violates their personal rights.

One of the judges involved in the lawsuit, Joanna Kruczkowska, raised concerns about the film's claims that the "invasion date" of the LGBT movement was four days before the election, because it may have influenced the results of the election. She also mentioned the film's use of ominous music to frighten the viewers.
