= List of Oddbods episodes =

Oddbods (also known as The Oddbods Show) (Note: Some other countries are using original titles Oddbods and translate the series.) is a Singaporean-British computer-animated comedy television series produced by One Animation. The series centers on eight characters—Bubbles, Pogo, Newt, Jeff, Slick, Fuse, Zee and as of season 4, Lulu—wearing furry suits of different colors. The characters make gibberish sounds but there is no dialogue, making the series easily translatable and international.

The series debuted in 2013. Each season has 60 episodes, and the first season ended in 2015. Season two followed in 2016. Season three released on 4 April 2022 on Netflix. Each episode is relatively short, and various formats have been broadcast, including one, five, and seven-minute episodes.

== Series overview ==
Season	Episodes	Originally released	
Season	Episodes	First released	Last released
1	60	21 January 2013	2015
2	60	2016	TBA
Specials	8	1 October 2018	5 April 2023
3	60	4 April 2022	
4	28	14 October 2023	22 December 2024

== Episode list ==
=== Season 1 (2013–15) ===
No. overall	No. in season	Title	Directed by	Written by	Original release date
1	1	"It's My Party"	Ehud Landsberg	James Phelan	21 January 2013
Jeff throws a party for himself on his birthday and is less than pleased when the others turn up to celebrate a surprise party with him. He soon finds his excessive need to control things puts a damper on things and the others leave, unable to express themselves and have fun. However, Jeff's insecurity is piqued when he discovers they are continuing the party over at Zee's place. Will he learn to chill out and join in instead of micromanaging everyone else's fun?
2	2	"A Good Heart"	Ehud Landsberg	Stuart Kenworthy	TBA
Newt is horrified by Zee's physical condition and ventures to make him fit and healthy again, whether he likes it or not. Will she succeed in making the most exercise-shy of the Oddbods into a fit individual or will Zee's creative ability to avoid all exertions at any costs win out?
3	3	"Marooned"	Ehud Landsberg	Richard Thomas and Woody Woodman	TBA
Jeff and Pogo find themselves marooned on a desert island. How will two clearly so differing characters get along in a shared space let alone come up with an idea to get them off the island and back home?
4	4	"Parental Instincts"	Jose Guzman	Stuart Kenworthy	TBA
Fuse chops down a tree in his back yard and finds himself the reluctant parent to a hatchling chick. Will the cute baby bird manage to melt the macho Oddbods heart and bring out the inner parent in him?
5	5	"The Sheriff of Oddsville"	Ehud Landsberg	James Phelan	TBA
As something of a stickler for the rules, Jeff is appointed warden for the cul de sac to help and control some of the more antisocial behaviours of his neighbours. However, Jeff soon gets a taste of his newfound powers and quickly his 'rule' gets out of hand. Practically everything you could deem as fun is soon banned. Soon the others are ruing the day that Jeff took over. They plot to bring him down so normality can return to the cul de sac.
6	6	"Alien Abduction"	Ehud Landsberg	Alan Keane	TBA
After a spate of alien abductions in the locale, Bubbles is determined to get to the heart of the matter and provide everyone with evidence of what is happening. However Zee, who is up for a late night snack of ice cream, quickly and unintentionally cannot help but get in the way of her goals. Will she prove that Aliens exist and discover why all the cows in Oddsville have been going missing?
7	7	"Slick Moves"	Jose Guzman	Stuart Kenworthy	TBA
Slick fancies himself as something as a good dancer, but the truth is that this could not be further from the truth. He is terrible. When he discovers the truth he is devastated. Jeff, however, is kind enough to offer his services and soon Slick is picking up some tips that help transform him into quite the mover. Jeff, however, is horrified to discover that while Slick is improving, he is far from the finished product and certainly not ready for the TV dance show he has entered himself into. Will Jeff save Slick from embarrassment or will Slick surprise Jeff with the performance of a lifetime?
8	8	"A Perfect Night's Squeak"	Ehud Landsberg	Lee Pressman	TBA
Fuse is woken in the night by a new house guest that keeps him from sleeping. Fuse decides to get rid of the problem but the mouse he is up against is proving more tenacious than he anticipated. Will Fuse manage to evict the problematic mouse and get a good night's sleep or will his excessive use of force for a small problem and his short temper end up causing more trouble than he could have anticipated?
9	9	"A Newt to Remember"	Ehud Landsberg	Alan Keane	TBA
Newt gets bitten by a werewolf while on a date with Slick causing all sorts of problems that he initially cannot explain. What will happen when he finds that his date is a monster?
10	10	"One Two Many"	Jose Guzman	Alan Keane	TBA
Pogo discovers a cloning machine and misuses it for fun. When he accidentally clones himself he soon gets a taste of his own medicine as his clone turns out to be even more of a prankster than he is. Will Pogo manage to close the lid on this mischievous Pandora's box and get rid of all the mess he's created or will his evil twin manage to get rid of him first?
11	11	"Pogo the Poltergeist"	Ehud Landsberg	Lee Pressman and Alan Keane	TBA
Pogo uses an invisibility device to cause all sorts of havoc in Oddsville.
12	12	"Robobuddy"	Jose Guzman	Stuart Kenworthy	TBA
Slick wants a new playmate that gives him more attention than his friends can. When the robot he buys to do the job gets struck by lightning, what he gets is more of a worst enemy than a best friend. His Robobuddy actively turns against him and tries to make him look back in front of everyone else. Will poor Slick manage to show everyone the real perpetrator or will the robot turn everyone else against him?
13	13	"Pain in the Arts"	Ehud Landsberg	Stuart Kenworthy	TBA
Jeff kicks Pogo out of his art class for messing around. Pogo takes great offense and decides to pursue his creative output anyway. Jeff is horrified to discover that Pogo's madcap and crazy creations are incredibly popular and successful. Why cannot anyone else see this work for what it is? A shallow joke? Jeff goes head to head to prove who the real artist is here.
14	14	"Zeellionaire"	Ehud Landsberg	Stuart Kenworthy	TBA
Zee strikes oil in his back yard and with the help of Slick soon realises that he has got his hands on the ultimate convenience he has never had before - money. Will the money change Zee and how will his new approach to living wash with his less well-off friends?
15	15	"Bad Medicine"	Jose Guzman	James Phelan	TBA
Zee sees how Newt nurses an injured bird back to health and gets a great idea that if he feigns illness/injury too then he might get the same pampering too. However, Zee does not know where to draw the line and soon he has got poor Newt waiting hand and foot on him. Newt finds herself getting exhausted by Zee's lazy demands. What will she do when she discovers that the naughty Zee has been having her on all along?
16	16	"Fuse Ruse"	Jose Guzman and Carlene Maclaughlan	Mark Hodkinson	TBA
Fuse has one temper tantrum too many and shamed by his temper decides to fake his leaving the cul de sac and adopt the identity of someone else less angry and short tempered. The others are soon intrigued by the appearance of this new neighbour and find that he is very easy to get along with. Fuse however quickly realises that pretending to be someone else does not make him someone else and he now has to work extra hard to suppress his natural urges and annoyances. How long can he sustain this ruse?
17	17	"Narco Klepto"	Ehud Landsberg	James Phelan	TBA
Bubbles is faced with a mystery that a thief is stealing things from the Oddsville overnight while everyone sleeps. She vows to catch the culprit and is horrified when she discovers all the stolen items locked away in her secret room. Further investigation reveals that she is the culprit and has done it all unawares while sleepwalking.
18	18	"Bubble Trouble"	Ehud Landsberg	Stuart Kenworthy	TBA
Jeff accidentally turns Bubbles into a baby and she causes trouble everywhere. Will Jeff revert this mess he has created?
19	19	"Double Date Trouble"	Ehud Landsberg	Alan Keane	TBA
Slick accidentally manages to double book a date with Bubbles and Newt on the same evening. Rather than come clean and admit his error he decides to keep both dates going at the same time. What follows is very much a farce as he tries to keep both parties happy and in the dark but ultimately fails miserably.
20	20	"My Hero"	Ehud Landsberg	Stuart Kenworthy	TBA
Slick accidentally manages to rescue Newt from a mouse in her kitchen despite being terrified of them himself. Newt proclaims Slick as her hero when it really is an undeserved accolade. When called upon to live up to his new role as brave saviour, Slick quickly finds himself in uncomfortable territory. He cannot come clean and he is not as brave as she thinks but he'd be devastated if Newt thought of him any other way. How long can he keep the charade going before being discovered and inevitably disappointing Newt? Will he manage to restore his esteem in her eyes when she finds out he is a phony?
21	21	"Florence Newtingale"	Jose Guzman	Aaron Barnett	TBA
When Fuse is injured helping Newt out she takes on the role of nursemaid to him. He however simply has had enough of her help and wants to be left alone. However, it is not long before he is offended her and in actual need of help.
22	22	"Hypnobod"	Ehud Landsberg	Lee Pressman and Alan Keane	TBA
When Pogo gets his hands on a hypnosis machine he tries it out on Jeff, who starts to think he has a dog one minute and is oblivious the next. It is not long before Jeff figures this out and decides that Pogo should get a taste of his own medicine. Jeff turns the tables on Pogo and takes the prank to a whole other level.
23	23	"The Oddbod Couple"	Ehud Landsberg	Stuart Kenworthy	TBA
Zee and Jeff are forced to live together when Jeff calls the fumigators on Zee's house, leaving him temporarily homeless. Forced to take in his guest, how long can this alliance of opposites last?
24	24	"Zee in Charge"	Carlene MacLaughlan	Mark Hodkinson	TBA
When Newt goes on holiday Zee is enlisted to house-sit her place and her beloved pet hamster. But can the laid-back Zee be counted on to be responsible while Newt's away?
25	25	"The Last Laugh"	Carlene MacLaughlan	Armin Prediger	TBA
When one prank too many leaves Pogo temporarily ostracized by his neighbours, he ventures to turn over a new leaf. However, he has a hard time convincing them that this is not another ruse that they are going to fall for. When he finally wins everyone around, the new, less annoying, sincere Pogo invites them all to a party at his place. But is all as it seems and can a leopard really change its spots?
26	26	"Strictly No Dancing"	Ehud Landsberg	Mark Hodkinson	TBA
Slick wants to win a dancing competition but he needs a partner to dance with him. Bubbles needs cash and the prize for the winners means she accepts Slick's invitation when he asks her. However, Slick is horrified to discover that Bubbles is the worst dancer ever - Rather than let her enter and embarrass him he gets the unique idea of replacing her with her impressive dancing robot instead and dressing it up in one of Bubbles' fur suits.
27	27	"The Amazing Slicko"	Jose Guzman	Lee Pressman and Alan Keane	TBA
Slick decides that he needs an assistant if his ambitions as a master magician are ever to be realized. He eventually recruits the eager Newt to aid him but she is disappointed to find out that she has been relegated to a mere side note in his act. Not one to be trodden on, Newt decides to intervene in the act and get a bit of audience attention herself, much to Slick's chagrin. What unfolds is an escalating tete-a-tete between two out of control egos that spares no thought for their competitors or the poor audience for that matter.
28	28	"Panic Room"	Carlene MacLaughlan	James Phelan	TBA
Pogo and Fuse get trapped in Jeff's house by his very potent security system while he leaves to go on holiday. The two guys must learn to survive and get along with one another with dwindling supplies and cabin fever. How long can an alliance be maintained when it emerges that each one has a differing idea of how to survive this challenge and what will Jeff think of what they've done to his house when he returns?
29	29	"No Good Deed"	Jose Guzman	Armin Prediger	TBA
When Fuse is rather embarrassingly rescued by Newt after an accident with some gym equipment, he ventures to try and save face and repay the debt to her. However, his attempts to 'save her' become nothing short of an annoyance and a hazard. Newt has to figure a way out of getting the well-intentioned Fuse off her back or shes will go crazy. Will Fuse repay the debt to Newt and mend his bruised pride?
30	30	"I-Scream Apocalypse"	Ehud Landsberg and Gilad Bahr	Stuart Kenworthy	TBA
When the aftermath of one of Bubbles' failed experiment ends up in Pogo's ice cream van, the neighbours all start to exhibit Zombie-like symptoms. Pogo must figure out what has happened to everyone and enlists the help of Bubbles in saving the entire cul-de-sac from a horrible fate.
31	31	"High Price of Neighbouring"	Jose Guzman and Aidan McAteer	Scott Albert	TBA
After Zee is found borrowing electricity from Jeff's supply, Jeff wants payment in kind for switching the power back on.
32	32	"Super Zeroes"	Ehud Landsburg and Gilad Bahr	James Phelan	TBA
Slick decides to become an anonymous superhero to help his friends and neighbours. However, when he decides to come clean as the real guy behind the heroic acts, he is devastated to discover that Pogo has taken all the acclaim and accolades
33	33	"Newt's Lucky Day"	Jose Guzman and Aidan McAteer	Lee Pressman	TBA
A cynical Pogo watches in amazement as Newt has an incredible run of luck after finding a four leaf clover.
34	34	"X Marks The Spot"	Ehud Landsberg and Samantha Suyi Lee	Stuart Kenworthy	TBA
Bubbles discovers that there is treasure buried beneath Jeff's beloved lawn. Jeff, however, has no intention of letting her dig up his precious pride and joy.
35	35	"A Marrow Victory"	Jose Guzman and Ruth Ducker	Scott Albert	TBA
Jeff borrows some radioactive material to help his prize marrow get as big as possible so he can with the upcoming farm fair prize. However, the vegetable mutates into something more insidious and soon he discovers that it has been swallowing his friends whole. Will Jeff come clean and do the right thing or is his ambition to win so great that he will turn a blind eye to the dangers of his Oddbod eating plant?
36	36	"50 Foot Zee"	Ehud Landsberg and Gilad Bahr	Alan Keane	TBA
Zee eats a marrow from one of Bubbles experiments and soon finds himself trapped inside his own house, swollen too big to escape his home. To make matters worse, Bubbles soon discovers that her experiment has some unwanted side effects. Everything that grows bigger as a result of her formula eventually explodes. Soon there is a race against time to find the antidote to her formula before Zee explodes inside his own home. Will Bubbles succeed or fail?
37	37	"The Last Straw"	Samantha Suyi Lee	James Phelan	TBA
Jeff is convinced that Pogo is plotting against him and despite seeing what Pogo is up to with his own eyes, he cannot prove his mischief to the others. Despite looking like he is almost harassing the naughty Pogo, Jeff refuses to give in and prove once and for all that Pogo is guilty of being up to no good.
38	38	"Build a Rocket Bubbles"	Aidan McAteer	Stuart Kenworthy	TBA
When a bickering Pogo and Fuse accidentally manage to find themselves launched into outer space in Bubbles rocket, Bubbles is none too pleased. The two bickering pals have to learn to work together to save themselves and get the rocket back to earth safely. Bubbles offers her help too to make sure they can complete the mission that was hers to do. Will they return to earth without fighting or will they be stuck up in space?
39	39	"Macho Jeff"	Gilad Bahr and Ehud Landsberg	Evan Menzel	TBA
When Jeff enlists the help of Fuse in making him less of a weakling, Fuse discovers that he has his work cut out for him. However, Fuse finally cracks it when he gives Jeff exercises that involve relieving his OCD. Soon Jeff is buff too, however, not everyone is au-fait with the new look Jeff who seems to have adopted some of the less pleasant personality traits of someone who takes their strength for granted. Jeff soon finds that he has offended his friends and has a lot of making up to do.
40	40	"One Short of a Full Set"	Aidan McAteer	Stuart Kenworthy	TBA
Pogo wants to go skydiving with Newt. Newt thinks this is her idea of hell: she is much happier putting the finishing touches to her kitty sticker collection. Pogo soon discovers the only leverage that can get Newt to agree to jump out of a plane for him: The final sticker that completes her collection. How far will Newt go to finish her latest completist obsession?
41	41	"Mind Control"	Samantha Suyi Lee	James Hamilton and James Huntrods	TBA
Pogo gets his hand on Bubbles's mind control chips and picks poor Fuse as the object of his latest 'hilarious' experiment. How happy will Fuse be when he discovers who has been messing with his body?
42	42	"Monster of Oddsville"	Ruth Ducker	Alan Keane	TBA
Pogo convinces the others a monster is on the loose in Oddsville when really it is just another one of his hilarious pranks. When Bubbles is enlisted to hunt down and get rid of this creature, things take a turn for the worse. Will Pogo outwit Bubbles here or will she get to the bottom of the mystery here?
43	43	"Zoom"	Aidan McAteer	James Phelan	TBA
Zee is zapped by an impatient Bubbles who is tired of being held up by his lazy, sedate sluggishness. Zee soon finds himself sped up by the beam but with some unintended side effects. He cannot get rid of his hunger. Soon Oddsville finds itself in the middle of a crisis as the unintended side effects of Bubbles actions come to bear fruit.
44	44	"Mr. Snuffles"	Ruth Ducker	Evan Menzel	TBA
Fuse discovers his long-lost teddy bear, Mr. Snuffles when prepping for a garage sale. However as soon as he is found, he is lost again. Fuse goes to extreme length to find his bear again (without being discovered again).
45	45	"Headcase"	Aidan McAtee	Evan Menzel	TBA
When Fuse accidentally breaks the top of Bubbles' Totem Pole, he lies about it and then spends the rest of the time trying to cover it up. But the head mysteriously keeps appearing everywhere, like a sin that has come back to haunt him. Did he unleash a curse or is there a much more reasonable explanation for what is going on?
46	46	"Technofogey Fuse"	Ruth Ducker	Stuart Kenworthy	TBA
Fuse is fed up with Newt and Slick's constant addiction to technology getting in the way of some old-fashioned fun together. He insists the give up their phones for the day while they go hiking. Which ordinarily would be fine, but they soon find themselves completely lost. How long can Fuse enforce the technology embargo before the others insist on getting their phones back?
47	47	"Acting Out"	Ruth Ducker	James Phelan	TBA
A movie set comes to the Cul-de-Sac and Slick wants a part in it. However, he has got hot competition in the form of other wannabe's and also from the most unlikely of sources: Zee.
48	48	"Pocket-Sized Pogo"	Aidan McAteer	Mark Hodkinson	TBA
Pogo shrinks himself to have some fun in Jeff's remote controlled plane but he gets out of hand.
49	49	"It's Just Like Riding a Bike"	Gilad Bahr	Aaron MacLaughlan	TBA
Newt discovers that Fuse cannot ride a bike due to a traumatic incident when he was younger. She kindly offers to teach him on her rather emasculating bike with stabilizers. Fuse accepts in desperation but how long can he keep these clandestine lessons a secret?
50	50	"Double Scoop"	Ruth Ducker	Aaron MacLaughlan	TBA
It is a sweltering day in Oddsville and Zee and Fuse bicker over who is last in the ice cream van queue. After their rowdy and inconsiderate behaviour results in both of them being banned by Pogo, they reluctantly join forces to try to get what they've just missed out on.
51	51	"Camp It Up"	Gilad Bahr	Stuart Kenworthy	TBA
Fuse goes camping for a bit of solitary time, however, it is ruined by the arrival of Jeff and all his modern conveniences. How long will Fuse and his stubborn streak last when the elements turn and suddenly Jeff's plush setup looks increasingly attractive?
52	52	"Wheels of Furry"	Aidan McAteer	Evan Menzel	TBA
After being excluded by the boys in their racing club, Newt tries to beat them at their own game.
53	53	"Oddball"	Aidan McAteer	Evan Menzel	TBA
Jeff is the most unathletic of competitors and when he, Fuse, Pogo and Slick managed to get roped into a sports game against some overly competitive Greybods, he quickly finds he is out of his depth.
54	54	"Let's See That Again"	Ruth Ducker	Alan Keane	TBA
Pogo discovers a remote control that can pause and rewind real life. This is too much fun. How will the others react to having their lives interfered with for Pogo's entertainment?
55	55	"The Shame, The Blame and The Fame"	Gilad Bahr	Mark Hodkinson	TBA
When Slick sees that Pogo gets famous online, he wants some of the fame as well but his videos are not good enough so Pogo decides to help him out.
56	56	"Anger Mismanagement"	Gilad Bahr	Stuart Kenworthy	TBA
After one tantrum too many, Fuse accepts the help of Newt to overcome his anger issues. However, the whole experience might prove to be more anger-inducing to Newt than it is to the short-tempered Fuse.
57	57	"On the Cards"	Ruth Ducker and Carlene MacLaughlan	James Phelan	TBA
Jeff tries to get Pogo back after pranking Jeff to many times but when Pogo sits on a whoopee cushion the game is on. Pogo dresses as a fortune teller and gives Jeff four cards. They resemble events that will happen if the future but it is only that Pogo will plan how to do them.
58	58	"Oddjobs"	Gilad Bahr	Evan Menzel	TBA
Zee does some odd jobs as he needs money for something important to him. However, his laziness and lack of work ethic make him something of a less than an ideal employee.
59	59	"The Brain Game"	Gilad Bahr	Richard Thomas	TBA
After a slow-witted cow nearly causes a road accident, Bubbles concocts a health serum to help improve the cow's brain function. Unbeknownst to her, the serum attracts the attention of Newt's performing guinea pig. As the guinea pig feasts on the food he develops a super-brain and begins to hatch an evil plan: It is time for the Oddbods to perform for him.
60	60	"You Can't Handle The Tooth"	Aidan McAteer	Richard Thomas	TBA
It is Photo Day in Oddsville - a time old tradition where the whole gang gets together for a team photograph. Every year Slick is accidentally obscured when the photos are taken so this year he is determined more than ever to ensure his face is front and center.

=== Season 2 (2016) ===
No. overall	No. in season	Title	Directed by	Written by	Original release date
61	1	"I Am Bubbles"	Aidan McAteer and Christian Cheshire	Richard Thomas	TBA
An eclipse is forecast in Oddsville and nobody is more excited than Bubbles. But when her friends mysteriously start to disappear, Bubbles, all alone, believes that aliens are behind the abductions. Are there sinister forces at large, or is it something far more innocent?
62	2	"Jetpack Blues"	Ruth Ducker, Carlene MacLaughlan and Simon Pike	Stuart Kenworthy	TBA
When Bubbles would not let Pogo use her jetpack, he makes his own. Pogo soon finds himself stranded in the upper atmosphere. Bubbles embarks on a rescue mission to get him back to earth safe and sound.
63	3	"Space Oddbodity"	Aidan McAteer and Christian Cheshire	Mark Hodkinson	TBA
When Bubbles is convinced aliens are amongst us, her reaction is to do everything possible to provide proof. However her usual overzealous approach to finding it only serves to embarrass and annoy her neighbours.
64	4	"The Oddfather"	Ruth Ducker, Carlene MacLaughlan and Simon Pike	Richard Thomas	TBA
Bubbles accidentally activates her 'Devolutionizer' device (age-reversing machine) just as it topples over, affecting the entirety of Oddsville. All the Oddbods devolve into Babybods; that is, all except Fuse, who is returning home after he went fishing. Now it is up to Fuse to babysit them, keep his temper in check, and figure out a way of undoing the whole process.
65	5	"Can You Dig It"	Carlene MacLaughlan & Simon Pike	James Phelan & Alan Keane	TBA
Newt's gopher has no interest in being domesticated and would rather spend its time eating Jeff's prizewinning flowers. Newt must protect the creature from a terrible fate, as Jeff would not react kindly to anything destroying his pride and joy.
66	6	"Arcade Slick"	Aidan McAteer & Christian Cheshire	Aidan McAteer	TBA
When Bubbles returns home with an old arcade game machine, Slick is desperate to play, even though Bubbles wants it for spare parts. In a freak scientific gaming anomaly, Slick is trapped in the machine, now it is up to Bubbles and her gaming skills to rescue an 8-bit Slick from a pixelated demise.
67	7	"Spiderman"	Gilad Bahr and Simon Pike	Richard Thomas	TBA
Fuse is enjoying a glorious morning of absolute manliness. The day is so sunny, Fuse fires up the BBQ and invites some friends over. However, one attendee arrives who is not on the guest list: a teeny-tiny house spider. Fuse is utterly terrified but reluctant to admit his fear. So he tries to play it cool and goes to extreme lengths (and lies) to avoid the spider, whilst saving face with his friends.
68	8	"Our Son Slick"	Aidan McAteer and Christian Cheshire	Mark Hodkinson	TBA
Slick's Dad shows up out of the blue, and, terrified that he'll discover what a messy party animal he is, Slick quickly pretends that Jeff's house is actually his and that Jeff is his butler. Jeff reluctantly agrees, but Slick's tendency to exaggerate and show off soon make this a thankless task for poor old Jeff. How long can they keep a lid on this secret, or how Slick will get away with this ever-expanding lie?
69	9	"Deserted"	Gilad Bahr and Simon Pike	Evan Menzel	TBA
Pogo and Bubbles get stranded in the desert after Pogo accidentally sabotages Bubbles' attempt to break the land speed record. What ensues is a struggle to survive, with one incredibly determined, and another incredibly annoying character. Will they learn to work together to get themselves back safe and sound?
70	10	"Your Move, Jeff"	Aidan McAteer and Christian Cheshire	Mark Hodkinson	TBA
After a sequence of annoying events, Jeff decides he has had enough of living in Oddsville. When everyone gets wind that he is leaving, they all rally to convince Jeff to stay. But whatever they do only seems to make everything worse.
71	11	"Jog On"	Gilad Bahr and Simon Pike	Richard Thomas	TBA
At the local park, Fuse and Slick fall in love with a female jogger who blows them both a kiss. The pair is determined to outshine one another to prove whom the kiss was intended for. Thus, a needless competition is born where the only rule is: "Win the love at all costs!"
72	12	"Hotdog 500"	Aidan McAteer and Christian Cheshire	Stuart Kenworthy	TBA
When Zee enters a road endurance race, his notorious lethargy hardly makes him favourite to win the prize: a huge trophy that looks to Zee like a gigantic hot dog. Especially when the others are so competitive they resort to unfair means to gain an advantage. However, Zee might not be fast, but he certainly is determined, and the fact that everyone competing in the race has already written him off might well help him land a surprise.
73	13	"Picnic Basketcases"	Gilad Bahr and Simon Pike	Evan Menzel	TBA
Newt and Jeff go out for the perfect picnic one day, except each has a separate idea of what that perfect picnic entails. Zee sees that they are bringing food and tries to steal some. Will they work out their differences or will a rogue squirrel, some cockroaches and an allergic reaction to bee stings get in their way?
74	14	"Double O Zee"	Aidan McAteer and Christian Cheshire	Aidan McAteer	TBA
When a rogue bear enters Oddsville, it is quickly put to sleep by the local park ranger. Unfortunately, a couple of his tranquilizer darts miss their intended target and hit Zee. It is up to the Oddbods to watch over Zee as his sleepwalking antics take him into dangerous waters.
75	15	"The Clown Off"	Aidan McAteer and Christian Cheshire	Evan Menzel	TBA
Pogo has gone too far with his story of "clowning around", so Jeff decides to be a mime as well. And then, the two get into a clown off! But do not they realize the money they got from was taken from a theft?
76	16	"This Little Piggy"	Simon Pike	Richard Thomas	TBA
Zee inadvertently picks up a stowaway piglet from a nearby farm. Undisturbed by the presence of the little chap, Zee quickly forms a strong bond as they discover similar interests, not least eating and sleeping.
77	17	"Robodd Wars"	Simon Pike	Richard Thomas	TBA
Slick, with a little help from Bubbles, enters a 'Robot Wars' tournament. As he progresses through the rounds, his increasing arrogance and hubris make him a highly unlikable winner. Will Slick selfishly embrace the spoils of victory, or will he learn the true spirit of competition: humility in victory?
78	18	"Brains Vs Beaks"	Simon Pike	Mark Hodkinson	TBA
When Jeff discovers some unwanted visitors in his garden, what ensues is a battle of wills between him and a pair of harmless nesting birds. As an intelligent and determined Oddbod, Jeff should have no problems forcing these tenants to migrate elsewhere, but these birds are not to be evicted from what they consider their home without a fight.
79	19	"Pogo and the Lamp"	Aidan McAteer and Christian Cheshire	Stuart Kenworthy	TBA
Pogo is bored and his friends do not have time to play with him. He discovers a Genie in a magic lamp who grants three wishes, and Pogo uses these to try to get Slick and Zee in the mood for some fun. However the Genie's wishes do not quite have the desired effect, and Pogo finds himself in a whole lot of trouble.
80	20	"Master Jeff"	Christian Cheshire	Aaron MacLaughlan	TBA
Jeff wants to impress the other Oddbods with his perfect hors-d'oeuvres, but he is upstaged by Zee, who presents a revolting-looking bowl of slop that turns out to be stunningly delicious. Jeff goes into training with the master himself and is horrified by Zee's unhygienic cooking methods. Nevertheless, in a desperate attempt to throw a popular dinner party, Jeff goes miles outside his comfort zone and tries to copy Zee's heinous recipe.
81	21	"Zee-Ro Gravity"	Simon Pike	James Phelan	TBA
Zee manages to accidentally stowaway on Bubbles' rescue mission to stop Oddsville being hit by a life-endangering meteor storm. Zee's casual laziness becomes a big problem for poor Bubbles and her mission to save the planet, but one of Zee's surprising talents means that he may be the very person she needs to complete the mission. Will Zee become the unlikely hero, and will he even realize what is at stake here?
82	22	"Monster Truck"	Christian Cheshire	James Phelan	TBA
When modifications to Fuse's truck cause it to develop a mind of its own, the proud vehicle owner believes his favourite possession has only improved. Yet when the truck turns truly monstrous, Fuse knows he must take back control and protect his friends. Even if it means destroying the thing he loves most in the world.
83	23	"Driving Jeff Crazy"	Christian Cheshire	Alan Keane	TBA
Pogo loses his licence after a bout of reckless driving and finds out that he has to pass his test to get his licence and beloved ice cream van back. He is horrified to discover that he has got the ultimate stickler for an instructor and examiner: Jeff. Will Pogo pass the test, or will he fail while driving Jeff crazier than never?
84	24	"Cross Newt Training"	Simon Pike	Aaron MacLaughlan	TBA
When Newt is upstaged by Pogo playing muscle-man, she grows determined to become strong herself. Fuse puts her through a macho training regimen that does not suit her at all, and when Newt rebels, Fuse finds the perfect training approach for Newt: Fuse's gym has never looked so pink and girly.
85	25	"The Abominable Snowbear"	Christian Cheshire	Richard Thomas	TBA
Snow falls on Oddsville: the perfect conditions for Pogo's pranking skills to thrive. But when his pranks go too far, Newt decides to teach him a lesson. Unknown to the pair, however, a hungry bear makes his way into Oddsville, leaving Newt and Pogo facing a much bigger problem.
86	26	"Recipe for Disaster"	Simon Pike	Stephen Senders	TBA
Jeff is throwing a party to impress some snooty friends. However, his unreasonably high service expectations result in the waiter he brought in to help quitting, leaving him without the staff he needs to impress his guests. Into the void steps Zee; probably not the best idea, right, but with no one else to help him what other choice does he have?
87	27	"Don't Open the Box"	Simon Pike	Richard Preddy	TBA
Newt ends up looking after a parcel that was delivered to Zee's place, as he was not at home to receive it. Her imagination runs riot as to what is inside, and it is not long before she is unable to resist opening the thing. Just one peek results in utter carnage being unleashed. Can she put the contents back in the box and cover up her indiscretion so Zee does not find out?
88	28	"The Grimbles"	Christian Cheshire	Justin Carr and Sinead Fagan	TBA
When Bubbles accidentally brings back a stowaway from space, Newt finds the cute little space alien utterly irresistible. How could anyone resist these cute furry balls of fluff, anyway? Soon she is keeping it as a pet, but quickly discovers that this is a species that multiplies at an alarming rate. Oddsville is soon crawling with these creatures, an epidemic of extraordinary proportions. Will Newt face facts and realize that something has to be done before everyone ends up drowning in 'Grimbles'?
89	29	"A Bridge Too Fuse"	Christian Cheshire	Ciarán Morrison and Mick O'Hara	TBA
Fuse has just about had enough of the others' company for a while and so he tries to isolate himself from everyone by retreating to the island for a few days. Just when he thinks he is alone, however, he realizes he has brought with him some unwanted company in the form of Slick. Slick does not seem to get the hint and soon finds he is getting on an increasingly impatient Fuse's nerves. How long will it take before Slick unintentionally pushes Fuse over the edge?
90	30	"Balloon Bods"	Christian Cheshire	James Phelan	TBA
When an experiment with Pogo's ice cream results in making everyone who eats it weightless, he does not fail to see the fun in this outcome. Soon he and a couple of others are loving spinning around weightless in the air. But Pogo being Pogo never gave too much thought to consequences. It is not long before the dream sours and they find themselves drifting away unable to come back down. With Bubbles on the case will she find a way of bringing them back to earth before they float too high to rescue?
91	31	"Fuzzy Fuse"	Simon Pike	Stuart Kenworthy	TBA
Fuse is too proud to admit that his eyesight is failing him. Bubbles cottoned onto the problem but Fuse is still unable to admit his frailty until the inability to see clearly puts Bubbles in real danger. Fuse must overcome his vanity and attitude if he is to get Bubbles out of the mess he is responsible for.
92	32	"A Class Act"	Simon Pike	Mark Hodkinson	TBA
After being humiliated by some snobbish Oddbods due to his general lack of etiquette, Zee finds himself being helped out by his pal Jeff. Jeff, being something of an expert in social manners, finds transforming Zee into a posher Bod something of a challenge. But Jeff's not one to quit easily.
93	33	"Attack of the Drone"	Simon Pike	Tim Bain	TBA
Fuse has a new job as a delivery man. Any enjoyment of the job is quickly undermined when he discovers that someone has been beating him to it, getting the letters and gifts to clients before him. But what is undermining him in his new role is something that Fuse does not usually have the best relationship with- technology. How can he beat out a drone to assume his mantle as the best delivery guy in Oddsville?
94	34	"Slicknado"	Simon Pike	Stuart Kenworthy	TBA
Slick sees the adulation that Bubbles' talent for invention brings her, and decides he wants in on it too. Unfortunately, he has not the talent for invention as she does. After several failures, he takes the shortcut of 'borrowing' one of her ideas, to disastrous effect. Will Slick be able to put the proverbial genie back in the bottle after it all goes wrong?
95	35	"No Go, Pogo"	Christian Cheshire	Dick Hansom	TBA
Pogo makes himself homeless while playing a reckless game and is kindly taken in by Fuse, who takes pity on his neighbour. However, it is not long before Pogo's impulsive prank-playing and desire to have fun all the time have his host's frustrations building.
96	36	"The Curse of the Three-Eyed Frog"	Christian Cheshire	Stuart Kenworthy	TBA
Bubbles, assisted on an expedition by Newt, discovers an ancient artifact in a cave. Newt thinks she should put it back after some evidence that it might have supernatural qualities. Bubbles, however, does not believe in that sort of thing, so merely pretends to put it back to placate Newt's anxieties. Once Bubbles has it back at her house, it is not long before a string of bad luck occurrences force Bubbles to confront the idea that the trophy from her expedition might indeed be a curse. They'll need to put it back where they found it before the unthinkable happens.
97	37	"The Jump"	Simon Pike	Justin Carr and Sinead Fagan	TBA
When Fuse gets a birthday present of a skydiving ticket from Bubbles, he is too proud to tell her he is scared of heights. Instead, he embarks on a strategy of trying to face his fears bit by bit and overcome them, but with the jump tomorrow will he overcome them or will he lose face and pull out?
98	38	"Caketastrophe"	Christian Cheshire	Phil Thomas	TBA
Zee is cupcake crazy and when he discovers that Bubbles is running a cupcake factory out of her house using one of her cool new inventions he finds it impossible to control himself: he must have more cupcakes. Bubbles however quickly cottons on that Zee has zero self-control and cannot be trusted to be let near her beloved machine. Zee has to outsmart Bubbles to get his hands on the tastiest cupcakes in Oddsville.
99	39	"Something Fishy"	Christian Cheshire	Alan Keane	TBA
When Newt crashes one of Fuse's solitary fishing expeditions, he reluctantly allows her to join him. However, insult is added to injury when it seems that Newt, while clearly being a total beginner is quite the talented fisherwoman and Fuse, for all his experience, cannot seem to catch so much as a cold. How long will it take before Fuse's bruised ego transforms this fishing trip into something more than the relaxing fun that it was supposed to be and the two friends have a falling out?
100	40	"Trainer Wrecked"	Simon Pike	Stuart Kenworthy	TBA
Slick decides he needs to get fit, and foolishly accepts Fuse's offer of a 'Boot Camp' administered by Oddville's most seriously alpha trainer. When it all turns out to be a bit too serious and hard work, Slick decides he has had enough. Fuse, however, would not let Slick be a quitter, and he has got Slick's signature on a contract to make sure there is no chance of wriggling out of this commitment.
101	41	"Oddbreak"	Mark Hodkinson, Sinéad Fagan and Justin Carr	Christian Cheshire	TBA
Newt has an accident with some paint flecks, and soon finds herself misdiagnosed with an infectious tropical illness by the others. She tries to explain, but no one is having it. They force her into quarantine in her house on the hottest day of the year. Newt has to find a way of convincing her pals that she is fine so that instead of sweating indoors, she can get outside and join the summer fun.
102	42	"The Cone Wars"	Simon Pike	James Hamilton, James Huntrods and Armin Prediger	TBA
Pogo and Jeff get into a battle over who can sell the best ice creams. It is not long before they both lose sight of the initial mission and their competition escalates to petty, absurd and destructive, levels.
103	43	"Twitcher Trouble"	Simon Pike	Stuart Kenworthy	TBA
Pogo finally meets his match when he annoys the wrong character, which incidentally happens to be an equally annoying and determined bird species called a 'Twitcher'. What ensues is a battle of wills to see who can outwit the other. In this instance, Pogo may have bitten off more than he can chew.
104	44	"Sickbods"	Christian Cheshire	Daniel Bays and Aidan Mcateer	TBA
When a highly infectious fever hits the Oddsville, Zee finds himself front and center in looking after his friends, who display a variety of extreme symptoms. Bubbles researches a cure, while Zee breaks his back trying to ensure his friends remain both comfortable and where they are, so they do not spread the disease to the rest of Oddsville. Will Zee manage to contain his friends and keep the virus from the outside world?
105	45	"Pogo Be Gone"	Christian Cheshire	Richard Thomas	TBA
In a moment of petulance, Jeff accidentally causes Pogo to crash land, causing Pogo to lose his memory and personality. Jeff, feeling guilty about his actions, decides to rehabilitate Pogo. But things do not quite go according to plan as Pogo begins to adopt the manners and attitudes of his career, and Jeff is soon stuck with a version of himself that is even more better than him.
106	46	"Bumble Bubbles"	Simon Pike	Aidan McAteer	TBA
Bubbles is transformed into a bee-sized creature after an accident with one of her experiments. While facing the dangers of the human world, she must employ the services of Newt to help her transform back to her normal self. But when you're the size of a small insect, this is easier said than done.
107	47	"Road Trip"	Simon Pike	Aidan McAteer	TBA
Newt and Bubbles take a car trip cross-country and soon discover that each has a very different idea of what constitutes a fun road trip. They soon infuriate Oddbods they encounter along the way. This leads to them spending their time running from trouble. Will they ever figure out how to enjoy the trip together?
108	48	"Wild Thing"	Christian Cheshire	Stuart Kenworthy	TBA
An incident involving Fuse accidentally sends Jeff off the deep end, and he quickly descends into a feral state or mentally ill. Fuse and Newt must work together to try and rehabilitate their friend back to normality, and civilization.
109	49	"The Gift that Won't Stop Giving"	Christian Cheshire	Richard Preddy	TBA
When Slick receives a knitted woolly hat as a gift from the well-intentioned Newt, he does not have the heart to tell her he'll look ridiculous in it. In order to get rid of it, he comes up with the inspired idea that 'accidentally' losing it is not as hurtful as throwing it away. As a result, he embarks on the absurd and funny task of trying to accidentally get rid of it. Except this thing just would not stay gone. It keeps coming back like a bad smell.
110	50	"Game Face"	Simon Pike	James Phelan	TBA
Fuse's terrible temper has gained him the reputation of being an awful person to watch sports with. When he smashes his own TV he manages to convince Newt to watch the game with him. Will he be able to keep a lid on his temper and be on his best behaviour or will he alienate another friend?
111	51	"Itch Hunt"	Simon Pike	Armin Prediger	TBA
When Jeff encounters a stray goat during a therapeutic spot of gardening. He chew's away the beast with haste. No sooner has the goat left when Jeff begins to itch. Seeing Zee asleep on his rotten old sofa - he immediately assumes his neighbor is responsible for this itchy outbreak. Jeff rallies the efforts of the other Oddbods to help capture the unsuspecting Zee and give him a fumigation bath. It is not before long the entire of Oddsville has the itch and the chase is on.
112	52	"Egg on My Face"	Christian Cheshire	James Phelan	TBA
Newt discovers an abandoned bird egg in the park, that seemingly came from an empty nest in a nearby tree. She takes responsibility for the egg and hopes to hatch it, but is distressed to discover that Fuse is tasked with chopping down that same tree. Newt stages a sit-in to try and stop Fuse from destroying the unhatched creature's habitat, and Fuse is determined to get the job done regardless.
113	53	"Snow Joke"	Simon Pike	Alan Keane	TBA
A snowy day and Pogo cannot resist the new pranking possibilities. After annoying all his neighbours, he is tasked with completing a boot camp that is meant to instil discipline in him and make him less impulsive. It would seem that Pogo has met his match in the form of a strict Sergeant who seems to be able to foresee all Pogo's pranks and tricks before they work. What ensues is a battle of wills between two equally stubborn characters. But who will be the winner?
114	54	"Storm in a Treehouse"	Christian Cheshire	James Phelan	TBA
When Newt struggles with building a flatpack tree house, she employs the help of Fuse in getting the job done. Except Fuse has ideas of his own and soon discards the flatpack stuff and begins to build a place in his own image. Newt is far from pleased with this new direction, and soon the pair find themselves at odds with one another. Neither shares the same vision for the project, and something will have to give.
115	55	"The Invader"	Simon Pike	Justin Carr and Sinéad Fagan	TBA
Oddsville gets its own alien invader, in the form of a popcorn-obsessed creature that has cloned itself so it looks exactly like Newt. Meanwhile, the real Newt finds herself trapped on a mysterious spaceship. How long before her pals find out what is happening and rescue her?
116	56	"Uncle Zee"	Christian Cheshire	Evan Menzel	TBA
Zee has the misfortune of having to babysit his disruptive niece and nephew who seem intent on wrecking both his home and his head. Will Zee manage to get a handle on the wild pair before his sister comes back to collect her darlings?
117	57	"Hotheads"	Simon Pike	Simon Pike	TBA
A pleasant afternoon's barbecue takes a turn for the worse when Jeff's foolhardy attempt to taste a drop of chili sauce backfires with embarrassing consequences. Humiliated and crestfallen - Jeff travels to a faraway volcanic island, to seek the help of a chili sauce expert, and learn how to conquer the art of eating hot foods. Will Jeff return to Oddsville a hero-of-heat, or will his bravado once again be his undoing?
118	58	"Pecking Order"	Simon Pike	James Phelan	TBA
When an incident with Newt and some local birds causes the accidental launch of Bubbles' rocket into space with the birds inside, Newt has to tell Bubbles what happened. They must come up with a plan to bring the birds back down to Earth before they starve in an unmanned spaceship. Bubbles, however, is unwell, meaning that the bulk of the heavy lifting is left to Newt. Can she mount a successful rescue?
119	59	"Let The Games Be Gone"	Christian Cheshire	Adam Cullen and James Phelan	TBA
Fuse feels excluded when all his neighbours become engrossed in a new Pokebod type game on their smartphones. He is horrified to discover that they are so glued to their screens they constantly put themselves in danger. Fuse takes it upon himself to save his oblivious friends from themselves but soon finds that it is a thankless task. How can he get them to realize the danger they are putting themselves in?
120	60	"Arctic Antics"	Simon Pike	Richard Thomas	TBA
Pogo prides himself on being a master of pranks. Yet even by his own high standards, this one is his most ambitious prank yet. Bubbles is the victim, as she is sent on an elaborate goose-chase high into the snowy mountains in search of the fabled Yeti. Pogo goes to extreme lengths to lead Bubbles on a merry dance, full of missteps and red-herrings. Nothing short of the real Yeti showing up can spoil Pogo's day. But how likely is that?

=== Specials (2018–23) ===
No. overall	No. in season	Title	Directed by	Written by	Original release date
1	1	"Party Monsters"	Simon Pike	Alan Keane, Guinea Flag and Richard Thomas	1 October 2018
Jeff has hired Marv, "the most marvelous" magician, to inject some magic into his spooky-themed costume party. The magician's act endures total disaster at the party, however, so he bitterly unleashes a powerful spell - cursing everyone in the room to become their costumed alter egos. With Jeff now being a werewolf, Newt being a flying witch and Pogo being a ketchup obsessed vampire to name a few, Slick - wearing a Sherlock Holmes costume for the occasion - must use all his detective skills to find the disgruntled magician and break the spell, so he can save Oddsville from his friends.
2	2	"The Festive Menace"	Simon Pike	Richard Thomas	3 December 2018
It is Christmas Eve in Oddsville, and the Christmas Tree is in full swing, until Pogo's pranks bring the fun a grinding half. So, Bubbles created an invention in order to make him nice. During Santa Cl'odds' visit in Oddsville, his delivery in Bubbles' laboratory was a disaster: he slipped on a snow globe and fell into Bubbles' invention she used on Pogo. Now that Santa Cl'odds has unleashed his evil form, the Oddbods are on a mission to save Christmas, and turn Santa Cl'odds back where he was before. Will Pogo return to his normal self, so he can save Christmas from the evil Santa Cl'odds?
3	3	"Zee Force Five"	Simon Pike	Richard Thomas	6 July 2019
While Zee is forced to work as Bubble’s lab assistant, he gets his hands on her cloning machine. Trying to get out of his duties, he uses the device and creates an exact replica of himself. Chaos ensues when the lazy clone decides to clone himself.
4	4	"Oddbeard's Curse"	Simon Pike	Richard Thomas	2 October 2020
When Fuse's catch of the day turns out to be a long-forgotten treasure, he accidentally unleashes a curse that puts him and his friends at the very top of the long gone Pirate Oddbeard's watchlist.
5	5	"Halloween Heroes"	S' Cephas	Richard Thomas	15 October 2021
When the Oddbods are invited to a Halloween party, they decide to take a few selfies in the museum. However, Zee accidentally bumps in a cauldron with its three gems, making it unleash a mean witch, causing a lot of chaos in the museum. Will the Oddbods save Halloween? Will the three gems be placed back to the cauldron? Will the witch be turned to stone again? Note: This is the first special to be 7 minutes long instead of 22 minutes
6	6	"Pumpkin Kings"	Simon Pike	Richard Thomas	5 October 2022
To compete in a Pumpkin contest, Pogo, Newt, Zee and Slick stop by a store to buy costumes and the most important at all: pumpkins. During the shopping, Zee buys a virtual gaming console, since he was looking forward to buy it. Later, Zee and Slick pass through a haunted forest, called All Hallows’ Eve - where Zee accidentally destroys a Witch's valuable properties, making her have a personal vendetta against Zee. Meanwhile, in Oddsville, Jeff prepares the world's biggest pumpkin of history. But the Witch made Jeff's pumpkin turn against everyone to hunt down Zee. Can Zee save Oddsville; perhaps with the newfound mobility from playing the VR console for too long?
7	7	"Santa Swap"	Simon Pike	Richard Thomas	26 November 2022
The Oddbods accidentally crash into Santa Cl'odds' workshop, and now he has hurt his leg Now it is up to Fuse save Christmas and take over Santa's throne temporarily, while the others help the elves restore the workshop before time runs out.
8	8	"Egg Hunt"	S' Cephas	Richard Thomas	5 April 2023
Easter has come to Oddsville, and the Oddbods are preparing for an egg hunt. While Bubbles was busy helping with the decorations, Pogo has an accident while hiding the Easter eggs into various places: he switched one of the Easter eggs with a dinosaur's egg Bubbles was incubating. And now, the egg has finally hatched, and the dino hatchling has wreaked havoc all over Oddsville. But in the end, he just only wanted to play and ended up taking a nap.

=== Season 3 (2022) ===
No. overall	No. in season	Title	Directed by	Written by	Original release date
121	1	"Swan Flake"	Simon Pike	Richard Thomas	4 April 2022
After Fuse and Newt are accidentally caught in the crosshairs of Bubbles’ latest experiment, they unknowingly switch bodies. Will Bubbles find a remedy in time, and how will that impact the potential dance performance of a lifetime?
122	2	"The Golden Ticket"	Simon Pike	Justin Carr and Sinéad Fagan	4 April 2022
After watching a television commercial for a chocolate bar that offers the chance of containing a ticket for an exclusive disco-party, Slick goes on an increasingly desperate quest to track down all of the chocolate bars he can, and get hold of the elusive 'Golden Ticket'.
123	3	"The Bald & The Beautiful"	Simon Pike	Richard Thomas	4 April 2022
Slick is determined to look his absolute best, using all the sprays and lotions he possesses for the annual Oddods group photoshoot. However, the discovery of a particularly defiant cockroach on his bathroom cabinet has Slick putting his grooming mission on hold as he reaches for the bug spray. This should not take long!
124	4	"Robo Helper"	Simon Pike	John Reynolds	4 April 2022
When Zee’s messiness encroaches on the rest of the neighborhood, Bubbles commandeers one of her inventions - a Robo-Helper - to help reign in the clutter. But Zee is too much even for a robot, which eventually malfunctions, becoming a complete mess itself, and quickly out-Zeeing Zee.
125	5	"Standing Tall"	Simon Pike	Joe Vitale	4 April 2022
Desperate to get taller so he can go on a super fun carnival ride, Pogo enlists the help of Bubbles’ new "growth chamber: to gain him some inches. When the growth chamber works too well, Pogo’s excessive height ends up causing more problems than he anticipated.
126	6	"Selfie Image"	Simon Pike	Richard Thomas	4 April 2022
Newt photographs Slick in an embarrassing selfie moment, forcing Slick into a series of desperate attempts to erase the image from her phone without her knowledge. However the more desperate he becomes the more perilous the circumstances he is prepared to endure, in order to preserve his pride.
127	7	"Fortune Rookies"	Simon Pike	Richard Thomas	4 April 2022
Slick and Zee are bumping around the sand dunes and are battling with an angry winter bear up on the ice mountain in their search for the hidden treasure on the treasure map. Is the treasure truly worthy of all the painful efforts?
128	8	"My Fair Bubbles"	Simon Pike	James Phelan	4 April 2022
Bubbles is initially excited to win a big science prize but then dismayed to see the invite indicates the winner must attend a very posh ceremony which includes an elegant dinner and ballroom dancing. Jeff, steps in as the ultimate etiquette coach, but even Jeff cannot sort out Bubbles’ two left feet.
129	9	"Stuck On You"	Simon Pike	Joe Vitale	4 April 2022
Pogo mistakenly handcuffs himself to Newt while practising for a talent show and promptly loses the key. Now they have to find a way to free themselves before the show starts, or do they work better as a double act?
130	10	"Ghosted!"	Simon Pike	John Reynolds	4 April 2022
When Bubbles discovers her latest experiment has accidentally introduced a pesky ghost problem into the cul-de-sac, she creates a "ghost magnet" to trap the spirits. But when the magnet breaks, she'll have to improvise to save the cul-de-sac from a band of mischievous ghosts.
131	11	"Re-Gifting"	Mike de Sève	Simon Pike	4 April 2022
Jeff receives an unexpected but hideous toy gift from his relatives, and cannot bear the guilt of tossing it. He decides to re-gift it to Newt for her birthday, but she does not want it either and the re-gifting goes on and on, spreading comic horror all around the cul de sac.
132	12	"Statue of Slickety"	Simon Pike	Richard Thomas	4 April 2022
Slick decides to try out Bubbles' latest invention and creates an awesome action figure that is a replica of himself. Little did he know that he is in for a big surprise.
133	13	"Bearly a Friend"	Simon Pike	Jordan Gershowitz	4 April 2022
Fuse and Pogo go on a camping trip together, however, Fuse's plan for a relaxing time is ruined by the ever-mischievous Pogo. This starts a prank war between the two, and when things go wrong they suddenly find themselves lost in the woods and having to deal with a very hungry grizzly bear. Will Pogo and Fuse be able to put their pranking aside long enough to stay alive?!
134	14	"A LaZee Holiday"	Simon Pike	James Phelan	4 April 2022
All Zee wants is to be lazy and rest on a hammock while enjoying the sun but when it came to Bubbles, she can always turn a lazy summer holiday into an unorthodox and fun one.
135	15	"Kung Phoney"	Simon Pike	Richard Thomas	4 April 2022
Pogo and Slick share a vision of fame and decide to film their own audition to win the job - to be the next 'Splat Ninja Show' Star!
136	16	"Every Cloud"	Simon Pike	Justin Carr and Sinead Fagan	4 April 2022
Newt tries to create a rain cloud with Bubbles's weather device to save her dying garden which is suffering from the heat. However, in her over-eagerness, now she has one stuck to her instead!
137	17	"Stoney Faced Slick"	Simon Pike and Woody Woodman	Mike de Sève and Jeff Hylton	4 April 2022
After stopping a fleeing thief, Slick is hailed as a hero and immortalised by a huge public statue. Unfortunately, the likeness is not very flattering.
138	18	"Jeff And The Beanstalk"	Simon Pike and Woody Woodman	Joe Vitale	4 April 2022
Jeff wakes up one morning to find his bed perched at the top of an enormous beanstalk, As he hangs on for dear life, Jeff’s friends try to figure out how to get him down.
139	19	"On Thin Ice"	Simon Pike and Woody Woodman	Justin Carr and Sinead Fagan	4 April 2022
Oddbods love fun winter activities like ice skating and playing ice hockey. This year, everyone except Newt cannot wait to have lots of fun at the figure skating competition with their dance partners. Will she find one in time?
140	20	"The Great Bod Bake Off"	Simon Pike and Woody Woodman	James Phelan	4 April 2022
Jeff has all the ingredients along with his best recipe to win the Cookie Bake Off competition, but it seems hard to win with Newt as his competitor. She is also a good baker. Who will win this cookie bake off, Jeff or Newt?
141	21	"Neanderthal Newt"	Simon Pike and Woody Woodman	James Phelan	4 April 2022
Newt accidentally frees a mysterious vapour from an ancient vessel that she finds at an archeological dig and it transforms her into a cavewoman. As Newt wreaks havoc in the wild, Bubbles must unearth a solution to get her old friend back, and so she sets out to restore Newt to her modern self.
142	22	"Festive Encounters"	Simon Pike and Woody Woodman	Justin Carr and Sinead Fagan	4 April 2022
Fuse has been abducted by Aliens with Santa's sleigh on Christmas Eve, in a festive case of mistaken identity.
143	23	"Boddy Guard"	Simon Pike and Woody Woodman	Chris Karwowski	4 April 2022
Fuse goes all overly protective to guard Jeff's precious, special golden Easter egg but a vulture will never rest till it lays his claws on it.
144	24	"Food Feud"	Simon Pike and Woody Woodman	Joe Vitale	4 April 2022
Jeff opens his exquisite restaurant in town, everything seems just perfect but comes along Fuse who is selling his greasy fast food from his truck parked right in front of his restaurant. The competition is high, how will this rival end?
145	25	"Taxi Turmoil"	Simon Pike	Mike de Seve and Jeff Hylton	4 April 2022
A thrilled Slick is determined as he speeds off to be the best, highest-rated driver, with 5 star rating in history!
146	26	"The Pied Piper Of Oddsville"	Simon Pike	James Phelan	4 April 2022
When a magical flute falls into Zee's lap and he finds he has a herd of goats under his control. With such great power, Zee gets many appetizing returns.
147	27	"Kart Wars"	Simon Pike	Justin Carr and Sinead Fagan	4 April 2022
The Oddbods learn how to build the most amazing and wackiest go karts to race in the best summer race!
148	28	"Unbearable"	Simon Pike	James Phelan	4 April 2022
Someone is eating all of Newt's pie and Pogo's ice creams, and the victim is not Zee! Will Pogo, Fuse and Zee be able to lure this stranger away before all the food runs out?
149	29	"The Cookie Crumbles"	Simon Pike	Mike de Seve	4 April 2022
When the fortune cookies at Newt's restaurant start predicting unwelcome fortunes that come true, her spooked-out customers start abandoning her eatery.
150	30	"Wrestlebods"	Simon Pike	Aidan McAteer	4 April 2022
Slick enters a wrestling competition to win the championship belt, but finds he needs to defeat the mean and unscrupulous current champion.
151	31	"The Zee, The Beach & The Wardrobe"	Simon Pike	Justin Carr and Sinead Fagan	4 April 2022
Zee discovers a magic wardrobe that leads to a tropical island. However, he unwittingly removes a sacred mask, incurring the islanders' wrath.
152	32	"I Love Fuse"	Simon Pike	Larkin Flanagan and Joe Vitale	4 April 2022
Bubbles creates a love potion spray that makes the wearer irresistible to everyone and everything. Then Fuse gets mistakenly blasted by it.
153	33	"Phoning It In"	Simon Pike	James Phelan	4 April 2022
When one of Pogo's fireworks enters low orbit and takes down a satellite, it wipes out everyone's phone reception in Oddsville. Pogo tries to pull some strings and come up with an alternative means of communication but ultimately he has to get the satellite back where it belongs.
154	34	"The Really Odd Parents"	Simon Pike	Richard Thomas	4 April 2022
Jeff’s worst fears come true when his Mom and Dad pay a surprise visit! Although carefree and fun-loving, they are his complete and total opposites. Can Jeff survive the weekend?!
155	35	"The Oddpong"	Simon Pike	Justin Carr and Sinead Fagan	4 April 2022
A mysterious green stinky mist has enveloped the Oddsville. Now they'll have to navigate and find the source of the Mist before it is too late.
156	36	"The Oddbunny"	Simon Pike	Justin Carr and Sinead Fagan	4 April 2022
Newt has accidentally transformed herself into an Bunny when she pins on a magical bow! Who can save the Oddbods' Easter Party and all the beautiful Easter eggs before she wrecks it all? Maybe it is the Easter Bunny?
157	37	"Jarring"	Simon Pike	James Phelan	4 April 2022
Pogo is humiliated when he is unable to open a jar of pickles at a neighbourhood event. And Fuse only adds to Pogo's embarrassment by opening it with ease
158	38	"Sugar Crash"	Simon Pike	Joe Vitale	4 April 2022
When Jeff wins a huge pile of candy, he is happy to share with his friends. But it soon becomes clear that no matter how much they eat, hardly a dent is made.
159	39	"Frankendoll"	Simon Pike	Richard Thomas	4 April 2022
Not having the most gentle touch, Fuse's earnest efforts quickly backfire as he manages to break Newt's favorite doll. Rather than confess and further compound Newt's misery, he goes about fixing the doll himself. After all, how difficult could it be?
160	40	"The Mermaid's Tail"	Simon Pike	James Phelan	4 April 2022
When Jeff takes the harp from the Mermaid Fountain to perform at the talent show, little does he know he will encounter some mysterious magic! A mermaid's TAIL awaits him! How will he end this magical mayhem?
161	41	"The Not So Sweet Ride"	Simon Pike	Chris Karwowski	4 April 2022
After a car accident, Fuse and Slick borrow a very cool car but sharing this sweet ride could leave tire tracks on their friendship.
162	42	"Pumpkinheads"	Simon Pike	Adam Redfern	4 April 2022
The pumpkins Zee has found for the carving contest have been cursed by a witch and transforms him into spooky characters.
163	43	"The Perfect Gift"	Simon Pike	Mike de Seve and Jeff Hylton	4 April 2022
It is Bubbles' birthday and Newt is not sure about the gift she picked for her best friend. Newt will have the adventure of her life trying to get her friend the perfect gift, not realizing that her friendship is already Bubbles' perfect birthday present!
164	44	"My Way or the Driveway"	Simon Pike	Aaron MacLaughlan	4 April 2022
Jeff is having his driveway repaired to perfection. Pogo teases him by pretending to almost walk on the wet cement, driving Jeff crazy.
165	45	"Superbod"	Simon Pike	Joe Vitale	4 April 2022
Slick gains superpowers and tries his best to be a model superhero, but only ends up causing problems for his friends.
166	46	"Jeff's Wish"	Simon Pike	Larkin Flanagan and Joe Vitale	4 April 2022
Jeff's having the least fun at his own party as things get increasingly chaotic and messy - so he decided to make a wish that changes everything.
167	47	"Gross Encounters Of The Zee Kind"	Simon Pike	Javier Valdez	4 April 2022
When Zee's house is too filthy for even his taste, he decides it is time to do what no Zee has done before... clean!
168	48	"Pogo The Powerful"	Simon Pike	Stephen M. Collins	4 April 2022
When a meteor crash lands in Pogo's garden he has suddenly given the powers of telekinesis, with some unfortunate side effects.
169	49	"Neighbour-odd Watch"	Simon Pike	Justin Carr and Sinéad Fagan	4 April 2022
After seeing a news report on a local burglar, Newt becomes obsessed with protecting the cul-de-sac from a potential robbery.
170	50	"A Not So Quiet Night In"	Simon Pike	Stephen M. Collins	4 April 2022
When a power cut strikes Oddsville, the inhabitants of the cul-de-sac are cast into darkness... apart from Fuse who is always prepared.
171	51	"Chickie & Hyde"	Simon Pike	Mike de Sève and Jeff Hylton	4 April 2022
Newt's adorable, fuzzy new chick turns into a ruthless and insatiable monster whenever she is not looking.
172	52	"Dance Trance"	Simon Pike	James Phelan	4 April 2022
An asteroid lands in the middle of the cul-de-sac and emits groovy pop music that puts the Oddbods deep in a dance trance except Slick.
173	53	"The Wild"	Simon Pike	Joe Vitale	4 April 2022
The Oddbods' summer vacation road trip takes an expected turn and they get stranded in the wild.
174	54	"Smells Like Trouble"	Simon Pike	Jessica Silcock and Naomi Smith	4 April 2022
When Jeff discovers a bad odour drifting from Zee's house he insists on helping Zee clean up.
175	55	"Groundbod Day"	Simon Pike	Aidan McAteer	4 April 2022
After a particularly frustrating day, Fuses gets entangled with Bubbles' latest time-reversing gizmo.
176	56	"Ready Player Odd"	Simon Pike	Adam Redfern	4 April 2022
Pogo gets a brand-new Splat Ninja Virtual Reality headset, which sends him Kung-fu-fighting out of his front door and over to Jeff's manor.
177	57	"Feel-Good Fuse"	Simon Pike	Mike de Sève and AJ Hubbard	4 April 2022
Determined to cure Fuse of his destructive tantrums, Bubbles invents a special training belt to help control his mood swings.
178	58	"The Corn-spiracy Theory"	Simon Pike	James Phelan	4 April 2022
When Zee witnesses Bubbles and Fuse planting delicious crops in the cornfields, he begins a series of greedy night-time raids.
179	59	"Fuse's Bad Run"	S' Cephas and Simon Pike	Justin Carr and Sinead Fagan	4 April 2022
Whilst jogging towards a rainbow's end, Fuse falls foul of a leprechaun and is cursed with bad luck, which follows him everywhere he goes.
180	60	"A Fistful of Dusters"	Simon Pike	Richard Thomas	4 April 2022
When Jeff bumps his head riding a mechanical bull, he wakes up in Westville - a Wild West version of Oddsville, where he inherits the role of Sheriff.

=== Season 4 (2023–24) ===
No. overall	No. in season	Title	Directed by	Written by	Original release date
181	1	"Halloween Bake Outbreak"	Simon Pike	Dave Ingham	14 October 2023
Lulu is hosting a Halloween pie baking contest, and Jeff really wants to win. When he uses Bubbles' magical recipe book without her permission, Jeff copies the wrong recipe, and spooky mayhem breaks out in the cul de sac.
182	2	"Pogo's Halloween Party"	Woody Woodman and Simon Pike	Dave Ingham	TBA
Pogo is determined to spook the Oddbods at his Halloween party, but Fuse doesn't seem to be afraid of anything. When a mysterious noise erupts in the basement, Fuse and Pogo investigate to prove their bravery.
183	3	"Pogo's Snow Bro"	S' Cephas and Simon Pike	Dave Ingham	TBA
Pogo loves playing games in the snow with Lulu and Zee, but when his friends head inside for warmth, Pogo feels lonely. Seeing a shooting star in the sky, Pogo wishes for a friend, and his snowman comes to life.
184	4	"Newt Ruins Christmas"	Woody Woodman and Simon Pike	Cameron Dixon	TBA
An overexcited Newt arrives with the Oddbods at Jeff's house for a Christmas Eve sleepover. When Newt spots her present under the Christmas tree, she wants to open it immediately, but Jeff tells her she must wait until morning.
185	5	"Valentine Daze"	Woody Woodman and Simon Pike	Dave Ingham	TBA
It's Valentine's Day. Fuse ignores Newt's warning and falls under the spell of a flower, sending him into a soppy, loved-up daze. Before long, the flower has entranced Jeff -- and Pogo too. How can Newt break the spell?
186	6	"Zee's Machine Mayhem"	Woody Woodman and Simon Pike	Alex Collier	TBA
Zee invents a robot to do his gardening work for him, but it malfunctions, mud-splatting Jeff's newly cleaned house. Jeff is furious, so Zee sets the bot into clean-up mode, creating clean-up chaos.
187	7	"Boogie Box Surprise"	Simon Pike	Adam Redfern	TBA
Bubbles has a mysterious locked box that bounces around to music. When the key for the box goes missing, Bubbles leaves to search for it. Can Lulu guard the box while Bubbles is away, and what's inside it anyway?
188	8	"Easter Egg Envy"	S' Cephas	Adam Redfern	TBA
Slick and Bubbles take part in Lulu's Easter Egg Hunt, but the eggs they collect keep disappearing from their basket. Slick and Bubbles blame each other, but soon they discover the mystery Easter egg taker.
189	9	"Pogo's Trick Scooter"	S' Cephas	Cameron Dixon	TBA
Pogo wants to make the Oddbods laugh with his scooter's trick box, but the box has a mind of its own, releasing the wrong tricks and upsetting the Oddbods. Will Pogo own up to the pranking, and how can he get his scooter fixed?
190	10	"Trash in Space"	Woody Woodman and Simon Pike	Cameron Dixon	TBA
Pogo accidentally breaks Zee's upcycled trampoline. When the pair try to fix it, they cause a trash emergency. Luckily, Bubbles has her rocket on standby to help. Who's ready for a space adventure?
191	11	"Monster Roar"	S' Cephas	Jo Clegg	TBA
Newt returns from vacation to discover she's accidentally brought home a cute monster with a loud roar in her luggage. She LOVES it and is worried what will happen if the others find out.
192	12	"Mother's Day Meltdown"	Woody Woodman and Simon Pike	Adam Redfern	TBA
It's Mother's Day, and Slick wants to impress his mom with a special present. When Zee and his naughty plant take up Mom's time, Slick goes to extreme lengths to get her attention, and the plant goes on the rampage.
193	13	"Monster Truck Trouble"	Simon Pike	Jo Clegg	TBA
Who will win the monster truck competition. Fuse or Jeff?
194	14	"Arctic Ice Cream Adventure"	Woody Woodman and Simon Pike	Husna Jahan	TBA
Pogo goes on an epic journey to search for Oddsville's most delicious ice cream flavor.
195	15	"Just For Kicks"	Woody Woodman and Simon Pike	Chris Parker	TBA
Lulu wants to score goals when she plays football (soccer), but instead she glitches Fuse's special ball and sends it into overdrive.
196	16	"Cupcake Carnival"	Woody Woodman and Simon Pike	Jo Clegg	TBA
It's Slick's birthday, and the Oddbods surprise him with a box of cupcakes and a visit to the fairground. When Jeff accidentally drops the box, he hides the truth about the ruined cakes from his friends.
197	17	"The Ice Cream Team"	S' Cephas	Zahara Andrews	TBA
Newt, Bubbles, and Lulu receive an urgent call from Pogo: he's run out of ice cream at a beach party. Determined to deliver what Pogo needs, Bubbles, Newt, and Lulu race through Oddsville, passing the ice cream tub.
198	18	"My Dino Pet"	Woody Woodman and Simon Pike	Alex Collier	TBA
Newt and Zee discover dinosaur bones in Zee's garden and piece a T-Rex skeleton back together. As they squabble over who the dinosaur belongs to, lightning strikes, bringing the skeleton to life.
199	19	"Hula Schoola"	S' Cephas	Dave Ingham	TBA
Bubbles can't hula hoop like her friends so she invents an auto-hoop which causes hula havoc.
200	20	"Tiny Race Cars"	Simon Pike and S' Cephas	Zahara Andrews	TBA
The Oddbods shrink themselves, hoping to win a toy car race. When Slick falls into last position, he super-sizes his engine, accidentally breaking the track, sending the Oddbods skidding off across Zee's giant kitchen.
201	21	"Dance Craze"	Woody Woodman and Simon Pike	James Phelan	TBA
Jeff's classical music is drowned out by loud beats from Lulu's Disco Wagon, leading to an Oddbods dance off. Lulu and Jeff try to prove to Newt and Pogo that they have the best dance skills.
202	22	"Bad Apple"	Simon Pike	Adam Redfern	TBA
Jeff pretends to eat Zee's wonky shaped fruit and causes an apple avalanche.
203	23	"Slick's Alien Mystery"	S' Cephas	Cameron Dixon	TBA
Slick wants to play with his set of collectibles alien cards, but he's shocked to find that one of the cards is missing. Slick pieces together some clues and concludes that real aliens must have taken it.
204	24	"Popcorn Apocalypse"	Simon Pike	Javid Rezai	TBA
Pogo is excited for movie night. In his rush to make the popcorn, he accidentally turns the Oddbods into zombies. Does Pogo have what it takes to fix his frightful friends?
205	25	"Superhero Showdown"	Simon Pike	Zahara Andrews	TBA
When some young greybods accidentally let go of their balloons in the park, Fuse and Bubbles rush to help. Soon, they're competing to prove who's the best superhero in Oddsville. Neither expect to end up on a desert island.
206	26	"Rescue Racers"	Woody Woodman and Simon Pike	Jo Clegg	TBA
Lulu's Disco Wagon is sparkly clean -- until Zee's ice cream accidentally splat-lands inside. Ziggy Piggy accidentally licks the vehicle controls, sending the wagon on a wild drive out of town.
207	27	"Doctor Odd"	Woody Woodman and Simon Pike	Dave Ingham	TBA
Bubbles wants to go to her favorite gaming convention, but Fuse insists she stay at home because she has a cold. Determined to get past him, Bubbles uses her watch to turn herself invisible and accidentally activates her jet pack.
208	28	"Accidental Ace"	Woody Woodman and Simon Pike	Dave Ingham	22 December 2024
Slick wants to do a new trick on his electric skateboard, but it's harder than it looks. When the trick goes wrong, the skateboard lands at the feet of curious Lulu, who can't control its super speed.
