= Invasion U.S.A. =

Invasion U.S.A. may refer to:

- Invasion, U.S.A. (1952 film), starring Dan O'Herlihy
- Invasion U.S.A. (1985 film), starring Chuck Norris
- Invasion U.S.A. (album), by the Riverdales

== See also ==
- List of foreign military attacks on United States territory
