= Peter Danielson =

Pseudonym

Peter Danielson is the pen name used by the authors of a series of 19 books published by Bantam Books between 1980 and 1995. The series, called Children of the Lion, is loosely based on Old Testament Biblical events.

The original "Peter Danielson" and creator of the series was George Warren. He wrote volumes #1 through #14. #15 was by Franklin King; Hugh Zachary took over the series with the next book and wrote #16, #17, and #18. The final book #19 was written by James Reasoner. During his run as the series' author Warren communicated with Robert Heinlein, who gave him writing advice. Cover art for nine of the books were created by Sanjulián.

== Series ==
- Children of the Lion (1980)
- The Shepherd Kings (1981)
- Vengeance of the Lion (1983)
- The Lion in Egypt (1984)
- The Golden Pharaoh (1986)
- Lord of the Nile (1986)
- The Prophecy (1987)
- Sword of Glory (1988)
- The Deliverer (1989)
- The Exodus (1989)
- The Sea Peoples (1990)
- Promised Land (1990)
- The Invaders (1991)
- The Trumpet and the Sword (1992)
- Prophets and Warriors (1993)
- Departed Glory (1993)
- The Death of Kings (1994)
- The Shining King (1995)
- Triumph of the Lion (1995)
