= Astro Battle 2009 =

1978 video game

- Developer: Bally Manufacturing
- Publisher: Bally Manufacturing
- Platform: Bally Astrocade
- Release: 1979
- Genre: Fixed shooter
- Mode: Single-player

Astro Battle 2009 or Astro Battle (since 2009 is the model number) is a Space Invaders clone published by Bally Manufacturing in 1979 for the Bally Astrocade arcade system.

== Gameplay ==
The aim is to defeat waves of aliens with a laser cannon and earn as many points as possible. Unlike Space Invaders, Astro Battle 2009 is in color.
