= Tactics of Mistake =

1971 science fiction novel by Gordon R. Dickson

- first edition cover
- Author: Gordon R. Dickson
- Cover artist: Francois Colos
- Language: English
- Series: Childe Cycle
- Genre: Science fiction
- Publisher: Doubleday
- Publication date: 1971
- Publication place: United States
- Media type: Print (hardback)
- Pages: 240
- OCLC: 130779
- Preceded by: Soldier, Ask Not
- Followed by: The Final Encyclopedia

Tactics of Mistake is a science fiction novel by American writer Gordon R. Dickson, first published as a serial in Analog in 1970–1971. It is part of Dickson's Childe Cycle series, in which mankind has reached the stars and divided into specialized splinter groups. The fourth book written, it is chronologically the second book of the cycle, occurring roughly a century after Necromancer, and a century before Dorsai!. The primary character, Cletus Grahame, is the ancestor of the key characters in later works: the twins, Ian and Kensie Graeme, and their nephew, Donal Graeme. (The spelling of the last name was changed in intervening generations.)

The key theme here is the development of the Dorsai culture, and the creation of the Dorsai military model which makes their soldiers the best among all the settled worlds. It also shows the growth of the separate planetary cultures and their evolution to independence from Earth.

== Setting ==
In the late 22nd century, humanity has settled fifteen younger worlds around nine stars, including Earth's solar system. Although Old Earth remains populated by the traditional variety of "full-spectrum" people, the younger worlds have developed "splinter" cultures, taking very divergent paths and developing specialized cultures. Most notable of these are: the Exotics, philosophers, mystics and psychologists; the Friendlies, puritan faith-holders who supplement the meager production of their rocky worlds by hiring out as mercenaries; and the Dorsai, professional soldiers. It has been less than a century since settlement of the other worlds began, and the younger worlds are still highly dependent on Earth.

Two primary factions control Earth, the Western Alliance and the Eastern Coalition. Although they are not openly at war on Earth, they support opposing factions in wars on the other planets. While the Western Alliance provides soldiers to these clients, the Eastern Coalition tends to send advisors, weapons and materials, relying on local soldiers. Readers in the early 1970s could not help but notice the parallel to the cold war between the United States and the Soviet Union in general, and the Vietnam War in particular, but that analogy breaks down as the story develops.

== Plot summary ==
Lieutenant Colonel Cletus Grahame has been an instructor at the Western Alliance military academy since a battle injury crippled one of his knees, and forced his retirement from active duty. He has completed three volumes of a planned twenty-volume series of books on military strategy and tactics, and believes his analysis can revolutionize military science, although many do not take his work seriously. Feeling he needs to get out in the field and try putting his theories into practice, he leaves the academy and arranges to be sent to the world of Kultis, where the Alliance is supporting the Exotic colony of Bakhalla in a war against the neighboring colony of Neuland, backed by the Coalition.

The heart of his military strategy, based in part on fencing, is what he labels the "tactics of mistake," enticing one's opponent into overreaching, and being ready to take advantage of the mistake. This description is an adaptation of a similar concept in the novel Scaramouche by Rafael Sabatini when the character Moreau studies at the salon of the Master of Arms.

On the first night out on the ship to Kultis, he deliberately antagonizes Dow deCastries, Secretary of Outworld Affairs for the Eastern Coalition, forcing deCastries to take notice of him. He also meets Colonel Eachan Khan, an officer of the Dorsai troops who have been hired by the Exotics, and Khan's daughter Melissa. Mondar, an Exotic official, is also present, and takes notice of Grahame.

Putting his theories to work, Grahame repeatedly entices deCastries and the Neulanders into attempting incursions, where he is ready to pounce on them. Finally, after conveniently getting his own uncooperative commander out of the way, he entices them to launch a major invasion. Using the Dorsai troops, who had been underestimated and little-used by the Alliance command, he actually wins the war, handing deCastries a humiliating defeat.

His victory has actually made him rather unpopular with his own command. Mondar, using the Exotic science of ontogenetics, recognizes him as a key mover of history, and tries to recruit him to join the Exotics, but he chooses instead to emigrate to the Dorsai, in order to begin building them into the kind of military force he envisions. It seems he possesses some of the advanced mental abilities of the Exotics, and with their help, he is able to heal his crippled knee.

Melissa wants her father to return to Earth, and the General's rank he had enjoyed in the Western Alliance, and to do so, she needs the influence of deCastries. Grahame forces Melissa to marry him to prevent Eachan's departure, as he feels Eachan is necessary to his plans.

Over the course of years, Grahame builds the Dorsai into the unique fighting force that becomes so famous in later years. With their advanced training and superior tactics, they can defeat larger forces and suffer far fewer casualties than any others, making them far more economical for other worlds to hire. Gradually, they reach a status where other worlds no longer need to depend on Earth for fighting forces to protect them, threatening Earth's control of the younger worlds through its system of client states.

To prevent this loss of position, the two Earth factions, the Western Alliance and Eastern Coalition, unite their forces under deCastries, and attempt to stretch the Dorsai forces so thin that they will be conquered. When Earth invades the Dorsai, there are no soldiers to defend it, but deCastries underestimates the power of the Dorsai people themselves. The final result leads to a totally new balance of power among the settled worlds.

(The actual battle for the Dorsai itself is given little coverage in this book. The ultimate battle for Foralie district, Grahame's home, ends up being between deCastries and Amanda Morgan, a woman in her late nineties who leads the home defense. In the novella Amanda Morgan she is used as the ultimate example of the spirit of Dorsai.)

== Reception ==
Algis Budrys gave the novel a mixed review, saying that although "there is no denying the power of this kind of storytelling, for all that logical analysis yields some stuff that can sound either ludicrous or gamy."

== Characters ==
- Cletus Grahame, a Lieutenant Colonel of the Western Alliance
- Eachan Khan, a Colonel of the Dorsai, formerly a General in the Eastern Coalition
- Melissa Khan Grahame Eachan's daughter, later Cletus' wife
- Mondar, an Exotic from Kultis
- Dow deCastries, Secretary of Outworld Affairs for the Eastern Coalition

== Sources ==
- "Library of Congress Online Catalog".
- Blish, James (February 1972), "Books", The Magazine of Fantasy and Science Fiction, 42 (2), Mercury Publications: 37
- Clute, John; Peter Nicholls (1995). The Encyclopedia of Science Fiction. New York: St. Martin's Griffin. p. 332. ISBN 0-312-13486-X.
- del Rey, Lester (November–December 1971), "Reading Room", If, 21 (2): 173
- Miller, P. Schuyler (October 1971). "The Reference Library: The Best SF Short Stories". Analog Science Fiction and Fact. LXXXVIII (2). Condé Nast Publications, Inc.: 168.
- Pauls, Ted (October 1, 1971), "Locus Looks At Books", Locus (97): 6
