= Spock Must Die! =

1970 novel by James Blish

- First printing (February 1970)
- Author: James Blish
- Language: English
- Genre: Science fiction
- Publisher: Bantam Books H5515
- Publication date: February 1970
- Publication place: United States
- Media type: Print (Paperback)
- Pages: 119
- OCLC: 847541600
- Followed by: Spock, Messiah!
- First edition/printing was not assigned an ISBN. Bantam Books catalog number: H5515.

Spock Must Die! is an American science fiction novel written by James Blish, published February 1970 by Bantam Books. It was the first original novel based on the Star Trek television series intended for adult readers. It was preceded by a tie-in comic book line published by Gold Key and the novel Mission to Horatius by Mack Reynolds, all intended for younger readers.

Blish aimed to kill off a popular character as a way to surprise readers, and during the novel's production chose Spock, with the aid of his wife, J.A. Lawrence.

Reviews of the novel have been mixed. Some reviewers have directed criticism at the structure or tone of the novel, while others have expressed no enthusiasm for the work, overall.

Spock Must Die! was reprinted numerous times with different cover art, including a cover by Kazuhiko Sano. The novel was collected in an omnibus for the Science Fiction Book Club in 1978.

Prior to the release of Spock Must Die!, Blish had written three collections of short stories adapting episodes of the television series. The second collection, Star Trek 2 (February 1968), included an adaptation of the episode "Errand of Mercy", which the novel directly references in the second chapter.

== Plot ==
Doctor Leonard McCoy and Engineer Montgomery Scott discuss McCoy's fear of the transporter. McCoy posits that an original person is killed upon dematerialization, and a duplicate is created at the destination. Scotty explains that the technology does not destroy the original object but causes every single particle to undergo a "Dirac jump" to its new location, and that converting a human-sized mass to energy would blow up the ship. McCoy is not convinced, and he wonders what happens to the soul in a transporter beam. The conversation is interrupted by the news that the Organians appear to have been destroyed by the Klingon Empire. The Organians had been enforcing a peace treaty between the Empire and the Federation, and the planet's disappearance is a threat to the peace.

As the Enterprise is a long way from Organia, Scotty develops a modification of the transporter that uses tachyons to create a copy of a crewman that could be transported to Organia long before the ship can reach the planet. Spock is chosen, but a permanent duplicate is created unexpectedly upon transport, as something at or on Organia has functioned as a perfect, impenetrable, mirror for the tachyon transporter beam. The crew is unable to distinguish between the two Spocks. Kirk arbitrarily designates one as "Spock One" and the other as "Spock Two". Spock Two soon argues that the duplicate will be operating on a pro-Klingon agenda, since, being physically reversed, he is also ethically reversed as well, and he states that the duplicate must therefore be killed, "even if it is I".

After faking a mental breakdown and barricading himself in sick bay, Spock One escapes in a stolen shuttlecraft which he has adapted to warp drive. This offers strong evidence that he is the duplicate and traitor. The crew find corroboration of this when they discover that Spock One used the Enterprise's science facilities to manufacture chirality-reversed amino acids. He had undergone a total left-to-right inversion down to the atomic level during his creation. To survive, he had to infuse the inverse forms of amino acids into his diet. McCoy explains that such a meager diet would have induced deficiency diseases in a human, but that a Vulcan is able to endure it indefinitely.

The Enterprise receives communiques indicating that the war is going badly for the Federation. Upon arriving at Organia, the crew are affected by a powerful mental disturbance centered on the planet. Kirk, Scotty and Spock transport to the surface, but Kirk identifies the Spock with him as the duplicate Spock (Spock One). Realizing the danger to Kirk and Scotty, via their psychic link, Spock Two transports to the planet and kills his duplicate. The landing party discover that the Organians are not dead, but imprisoned. A weapon deployed by the Klingons has restrained their mental abilities, preventing them from expressing their thoughts. As thought-creatures, the restraint will ultimately destroy them if it is not disabled. Scotty is able to disable the weapon and the thought screen surrounding the planet, freeing the Organians. In retaliation, the Klingon race is confined to their homeworld, and the Klingon commander, Koloth, is trapped in a bubble of asymptotically slowing time, unaware of his fate.

The Enterprise continues on its five-year mission of exploration.

== Production ==
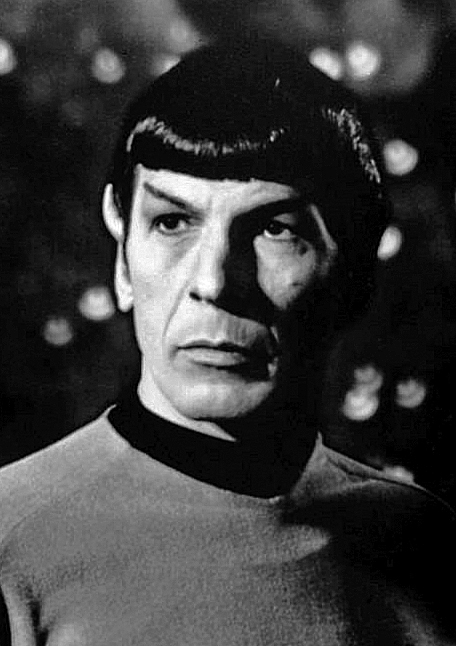
Spock was killed off in the story by James Blish to surprise readers.

For the first original Star Trek novel for adults, Blish wanted to surprise readers by killing a popular character. Unexpectedly, Spock had been the most popular character in the television series—more popular than Captain Kirk. Blish discussed his premise with his wife, J.A. Lawrence, only to discover she preferred Spock to Kirk, as well. Following their discussion, Blish chose to kill Spock.

The plot, featuring both the Klingons and the Organians, is a follow-up to the first season episode "Errand of Mercy", which had previously been adapted into a short story by Blish, published in Star Trek 2 (February 1968).

Spock Must Die! contains a number of references to other works: Mervyn Peake's Gormenghast series is hinted at by an alien species found on Organia called "gormenghastlies" by Kirk; Uhura says she is able to transmit a message in Eurish, a reference to James Joyce's Finnegans Wake; Scotty uses the word "mathom" to describe the objects that have materialized on the ship as part of his transporter experiments, which is a reference to The Lord of the Rings. Another alien species mentioned is the "reepicheep", based on the name of a Talking Mouse in Prince Caspian and Voyage of the Dawn Treader.

The novel's conclusion does not reset the universe, as was common in episodes of the television series. Instead, the Organians have confined the Klingon race to their homeworld for a thousand years, unable to take advantage of space flight, and the antagonist Commander Koloth is trapped in an asymptotically slowing distortion of local time, unaware of his punishment. It is likely Blish would have continued to explore the results of these changes in a follow-up novel.

Spock Must Die! was released after the cancellation of the television series. Blish included a rally cry in his "Author's Notes" to encourage fans to advocate for the series renewal.

Sales of the novel following its release were promising, but Blish's death in 1975 ended all plans for follow-up. Spock, Messiah! by Theodore Cogswell and Charles Spano, released in September 1976, is not a sequel to Spock Must Die!.

Spock Must Die! was collected in the omnibus The Star Trek Reader IV (April 1978), for the Science Fiction Book Club. Also included were the short story collections Star Trek 10 (February 1974), and Star Trek 11 (April 1975). Bantam Books reprinted and reissued the novel twenty times from February 1970 to June 1996. The final printing featured an original cover designed by Japanese artist Kazuhiko Sano.

== Reception ==
In A Clash of Symbols (October 1979), Brian M. Stableford described the novel as a "combination of space opera and whimsy, quite typical of the Star Trek mythos". Stableford believed the sequences in the novel would have been too expensive for the television series. However, the novel's structure was similar to an actual episode containing "sub-climaxes that one can easily imagine would bracket commercial breaks".

Strother B. Purdy referred to novel's text as a "rather well-written" example of the duplication of characters in science fiction, in his study The Hole in the Fabric (March 1977). Purdy was also impressed by novel's play on elements in the vein of Martin Gardner's The Ambidextrous Universe and Lewis Carroll's Through the Looking-Glass. Astrobiologist Daniel Glavin was quoted in the 15 May 2010 issue of the New Scientist, saying it was an "intriguing idea" and that Spock Must Die! is "certainly a novel turn in this twistiest of tales: the story of how life came to be left-handed".

Ellen Kozak reviewed Spock Must Die! as "one of the better original novels written from the series" in the December 1979 issue of Science Fiction and Fantasy Book Review. Encyclopedia of Science Fiction (May 2005), by Don D'Ammassa, synopsizes the novel as "interesting historically, but … a mediocre piece of fiction". George Mann criticised Blish's Star Trek fiction, including Spock Must Die!, as "obviously written primarily for money", and that Blish does not display the "literary and intellectual skill evident in his earlier work".

== See also ==
- "Errand of Mercy" – an episode of The Original Series which features the Organians and the basis of Spock Must Die!
- "The Enemy Within" – an episode of The Original Series which features a duplicate Captain Kirk.
- "Second Chances" – an episode of The Next Generation where a duplicate of Commander William T. Riker is found.
- "Mirror, Mirror" – an episode of The Original Series where Captain Kirk goes to a parallel universe where other characters have evil counterparts.
- Chirality (physics)
- Chirality (chemistry)
- Tachyon
