= Amanda Morgan =

1979 novella by Gordon R. Dickson

- Short story by Gordon R. Dickson
- Genre: Science fiction

Publication
- Published in: The Spirit of Dorsai
- Publication date: 1979

Amanda Morgan is a science fiction novella by American writer Gordon R. Dickson, first published in The Spirit of Dorsai in 1979 and later included in The Dorsai Companion in June 1986. The story is set in 2185 on the Dorsai, a key planet and Splinter Culture of Dickson's future history known as the Childe Cycle. "Amanda Morgan" is a perspective piece expanding and illuminating the crisis of the novel Tactics of Mistake, in which the planet known as The Dorsai is attacked for the sake of defeating Cletus Grahame. Amanda Morgan, also known as the first Amanda, leads the resistance in Grahame's home district. The theme of the story may be understood as: Moral strength is more important than physical strength in the struggle for identity.

== Plot summary ==
In both "Amanda Morgan" and the later portion of Tactics of Mistake, Dow de Castres unites Earth forces and galvanizes Earth opinion against the Splinter Cultures of the colonized worlds and against Cletus Grahame who leads the bid for independence of those cultures. As de Castres arrives at The Dorsai's Foralie District, local residents, under Amanda Morgan, enact a pre-arranged plan of defending their home against the invading troops with the power of the disabled, the elderly, and the children. The plan is predicated on the principle of inevitable and acceptable losses in the face of unavoidable conflict. As a science fiction story, it employs a subtle and clever, nearly passive form of chemical warfare as a military action. The theme is given its central power when the disabled, the elderly, and the children overcome the seasoned and better equipped Earth troops in the cause of their culture's independence from Earth control.

The subplot of the naming of Betta Hasegawa's child, Amanda's great-great grandchild, treats Amanda Morgan's age with sympathy and grace. Amanda Morgan is a strong and able commander and a flawed, elderly woman of pride and wisdom. Both her strengths and weaknesses are treated with literary integrity. Morgan's identity in the inner struggle over the use of her name, is as important as the idea of cultural identity to the development of the overall Cycle theme.

== Characters ==
- Amanda Morgan
- Ramon Dye
- Alexandra Andrea
- Timothy Royce
- Bill Athyers
- Arvid Johnson
- Betta Hassegawa
- Dow de Castres

== Point of view ==
Point of view is a support mechanism for the Childe Cycle's grand theme, the evolution of Responsible Man in the face of the forces of conservatism. "Amanda Morgan" is a detail perspective of a portion of Tactics of Mistake. This device is also used between Soldier, Ask Not, "Brothers" and Dorsai, as well as among the later novels of the cycle. Amanda Morgan's point of view, highlights the crisis of Tactics of Mistake as a locus moment in the future evolution of humanity. This evolution transcends ethnicity and is focused instead on the hard-wired development of moral character, the achievement of Responsible Man. In "Amanda Morgan", the willingness of some to directly and intentionally sacrifice themselves for the good of the planet demonstrates their superiority over the Earth strategists who are unable to imagine such a tactic.

Cletus Grahame has not dictated the use of Foralie's strategy of sacrifice, but has trusted their competence and courage. Amanda's willingness to enforce such a plan demonstrates her superior grasp on inevitability and the personal choices of those who sacrifice themselves. Their moral courage outweighs the military courage of those who are willing even to attack a planet entirely given over to the mercenary industry. The perspective mechanism gives Dickson the opportunity to demonstrate that the advances in human character will not be simply the domain of his powerful and central major characters, but of general development of the race. That which is true of Cletus Grahame is also true of Amanda Morgan, and more importantly of the children Alexandra Andrea and Timothy Royce.
