= Spock, Messiah! =

1976 novel by Theodore R. Cogswell and Charles A. Spano, Jr

- First printing (Sep 1976)
- Authors: Theodore R. Cogswell; Charles A. Spano, Jr.
- Cover artist: Gene Szafran
- Language: English
- Genre: Science fiction
- Publisher: Bantam Books
- Publication date: September 1976
- Publication place: United States
- Media type: Print (Paperback))
- Pages: 182
- ISBN: 0-553-10159-5
- OCLC: 2653680
- Preceded by: Spock Must Die!
- Followed by: The Price of the Phoenix

Spock, Messiah! (September 1976) is the second original novel based on television series Star Trek intended for adult readers, written by Theodore R. Cogswell and Charles A. Spano, Jr. It was preceded by Spock Must Die! (1970), and Mission to Horatius (1968). However, Mission was intended for young readers.

Initial reaction to Spock, Messiah! was poor, and sales did not meet the expectations set by the release of Spock Must Die! The novel was criticised for being exploitative, and inaccurate in relation to the television series.

== Plot ==
The Enterprise visits the planet Kyros to observe the population, and test a new telepathic implant. The people living on the planet traditionally cover their faces, and the devices allow the wearer to mentally link with a member of the populace, accessing both their memories and instincts allowing the crew to walk around the planet freely.

Following an away mission to the planet, Spock refuses to return to the ship declaring himself to be the planet's messiah. He threatens to destroy crystals vital to the success of the mission.

The crew discover Spock had been linked to a fanatic named Chag Gara. However, due to an increase in radiation, the Enterprise must leave planetary orbit sooner than expected, but the crew cannot depart without the crystals held by Spock. The crew also discover that an Ensign George had intentionally damaged Spock's implant while under the influence of Gara. She returns to the planet with Kirk, Commander Scott and Ensign Chekov.

The away team tracks Spock, who flees when he sees George. The first attempt to subdue him fails. A second attempt is made, with Kirk masquerading as a gypsy, so he can follow Spock without being seen. However, the away team is captured by Spock's disciples. After a demonstration of advanced Starfleet technology, they are allowed to live. George then dances for their captors, and seduces the Messiah. She determines the Messiah is not actually Spock, but is Chag Gara. Once Gara is restrained, Spock is found and revived.

The away team returns to the Enterprise.

== Production ==
Prior to Spock, Messiah!, only one Star Trek tie-in novel intended for adult readers had been published, Spock Must Die!, written by James Blish. Blish's novel had sold well, and further books were planned, including a novel featuring the character Harry Mudd. However, Blish's unexpected death halted further work. The Harry Mudd concept did eventually become Mudd's Angels (May 1978), written by J.A. Lawrence, Blish's wife.

Frederik Pohl, editor at Bantam Books, was tasked with producing new Star Trek originals. In addition to acquiring the reference work Star Trek Lives! (July 1976), he recruited Cogswell to realize Spock, Messiah! with one injunction: "Get them off the damned ship!"

Cogswell contacted young writer Spano, Jr., and ask if he would be interested in co-authoring a Star Trek novel on Pohl's behalf. Spano agreed, and wrote a majority of the first draft in late-1975, inspired by then recent 1973 oil crisis. Spano said in Voyages of Imagination that although it had roots in the rise of Islamism, the premise of the novel was a familiar one, "the idea that a fanatical desert leader could arise to threaten a civilisation was a staple throughout history."

Cogswell rewrote several chapters which Spano described as unfocused and rambling; Cogswell also copyedited the work prior to publication. They submitted the revised draft to Pohl, who requested minor changes, and the book was put to print.

The novel was released in September 1976, and later reprinted by Bantam Spectra in October 1993 with cover art by Kazuhiko Sano.

== Reception ==
A review published by Science Fiction and Fantasy Book Review (1976) suggested the action was far-fetched, and described the plot as "Spocks-ploitation." The novel was reviewed in first issue of BSFA's Paperback Parlour released to members during February 1977.

In 2011, a contributor to the Daily Kos website, explained Spock, Messiah! was the "single worst Star Trek story I have ever read, either fan or pro." Noted issues included racism (Uhura is called "the black," and Sulu "the oriental"), altering the appearance of characters (Scotty described as having red hair), and ignoring technology present in the television version of the Enterprise (no sonic showers). The review concluded the "book isn't just bad, it's shamefully bad."

Spano noted in Voyages of Imagination that Spock, Messiah!'s publication, and eventual sales success, validated Pohl's theory "that there was a hunger for original Star Trek novels." He said he is "proud to have had a small part in the expanding Star Trek … universe."
