= Border, Breed nor Birth =

1962 novel by Mack Reynolds

- First edition
- Author: Mack Reynolds
- Cover artist: Ian Miller
- Language: English
- Genre: Science Fiction
- Publisher: Ace Books
- Publication place: United States
- Media type: Print (Serial, Paperback)
- Followed by: "Black Sheep Astray"

Border, Breed nor Birth is a science fiction novella by American writer Mack Reynolds. It is the second in a sequence of near-future stories set in North Africa, which also includes Black Man's Burden (1961–1962), "Black Sheep Astray" (1973), and The Best Ye Breed (1978). Border, Breed nor Birth and the North Africa series have been called a "notable exception" to the indirect treatment of racial issues in 1960s science fiction magazines.

== Plot ==
During his meeting in Dakar with the head of the Reunited Nations African Development Project, Dr. Homer Crawford resigns his post as leader of the Sahara Division team to become El Hassan, the liberator and would-be tyrant of North Africa. Threatened with arrest, Crawford and his followers hide in the Sahara erg. They intercept news that the Arab Union has occupied Tamanrasset, ostensibly to protect the region against El Hassan rioters. Crawford decides to recapture Tamanrasset and use its communications system to proclaim his regime. To do so, he sends his followers to organize troops from nearby regions: the Teda from the east, the Chaambra from the north, the Sudanese from the south, and the Nemadi, Moors, and Rifs from the West. Crawford, Isobel Cunningham, and Cliff Jackson will establish the movement's headquarters in Tuareg country. They are all to rendezvous at Tamanrasset in two weeks.

Crawford wins the loyalty of the Tuareg warriors by offering to make them the core of El Hassan's Desert Legion during wartime and his policemen and rangers during peacetime. Rex Donaldson, ex-field expert for the African Department of the British Commonwealth, arrives to join Crawford's organization, bringing fieldworkers Jack and Jimmy Peters and David Moroka with him. As they are being briefed, David thwarts an assassination attempt against Crawford, killing the assassin. Crawford then sends Rex to recruit troops in Senegal and Mali. Now guarded by fifteen Tuareg warriors, Crawford's group travels the country to rally up forces for the upcoming Tamanrasset battle. They capture Dr. Warren Harding Smythe's American Medical Relief team and force them to join the group. As Crawford's team puts together El Hassan's government, Jack proposes that they make Esperanto the common language of the movement. Kenny Ballalou arrives from the West with news: several Reunited Nations development teams have joined El Hassan, so he now controls a large portion of North Africa. As El Hassan's influence grows, so does his camp, which fills with reporters and foreign diplomats anxious to meet him.

Crawford's group decides to use guerrilla tactics to disable the mechanized army of the Arab Union. They are reprieved from air attack temporarily when the Reunited Nations announces retaliation against any power that uses air combat. Meanwhile, David, who in reality is a Party member of the Soviet Complex, radios his superiors, revealing that he engineered the attempted assassination of Crawford to earn his trust. C.I.A. agent Fred Ostrander arrives at the camp to remind Crawford of his allegiance to the United States and the West, but Crawford responds that he is an African looking for African solutions to African problems. When Ostrander challenges Crawford to explain why he is the man to lead North Africa, Crawford responds that he was thrust into the job. He then expresses deep regret that becoming El Hassan led him to kill his best friend, Abe, who wanted him to swear allegiance to the Soviet Complex. Crawford's confession disarms David, whose spying has been fueled by a desire to revenge Abe.

Isobel surprises David as he is reporting to his superiors, but when confronted by the team, David claims he has resigned from the Party and is now an El Hassan man. He also informs them that the Arab Union is planning to parachute troopers into various points of the Sahara. Ostrander, who has decided to join El Hassan's team as well, earns them some time by telling the commander of the Arab legion that the United States will send its own air force to aid El Hassan if the paratroopers are deployed. As everyone arms for battle, David and Ostrander have one last conversation, in which they insist that their long-term socioeconomical views have not changed, but that both believe African union takes precedence for the moment. They wish each other well during the coming fight.

During the aftermath of the successful recapture of Tamanrasset, Crawford finds that Jack, David, and Ostrander are dead and that Kenny has been seriously hurt. He then receives good news and bad news: foreign countries and organizations have begun to recognize El Hassan as the legal head of North Africa; Elmer Allen has been captured by one of Crawford's enemies, the leader of the Ouled Touameur clan, Abd-el-Kader. To make matters worse, Abd-el-Kader now claims to be the reincarnation of the Mahdi, the holiest prophet since Mohammed, so that he can call on a holy war against El Hassan.

== Characters ==
- Homer Crawford/El Hassan: the idealistic and charismatic would-be tyrant of North Africa. He is an American black and an ex-Marine with a Ph.D. in sociology from the University of Michigan. He speaks Arabic, Esperanto, French, Tamabeq, Songhoi, and Swahili.
- Bey-ag-Akhamouk: one of Crawford's close associates. He becomes El Hassan's Minister of Defense. He is an African of Tuareg background who was taken to the United States at an early age, where he became an American citizen and graduated from the University of Minnesota with a degree in political science.
- Isobel Cunningham (a.k.a. Sitt Izubahil): one of Crawford's close associates. An American black who looks like Lena Horne, she graduated from Columbia University with a master's degree in anthropology. She speaks Arabic and Songhoi, as well as some Esperanto.
- Clifford "Cliff" Jackson: one of Crawford's close associates. He becomes El Hassan's Minister of Finance. An American black, he is described as having the looks and physique of Joe Louis.
- Elmer Allen: one of Crawford's close associates. A Jamaican black with a Masters in Sociology from the University of Kingston, and a pacifist.
- Kenneth "Kenny" Ballalou: one of Crawford's close associates. He is an American black from San Francisco; he speaks multiple languages.
- Jake Armstrong: one of Crawford's associates. He becomes El Hassan's Foreign Minister. He is an American black.
- Rex Donaldson: one of Crawford's associates. A black citizen of the Bahamas who speaks Dogon, he is considered a "witchman" by the tribes he visits in his helio-hopper.
- David Moroka (a.k.a. Anton): a Soviet hatchet man whose mission is to infiltrate El Hassan's operation. He becomes El Hassan's Press Secretary. He is a black South African.
- Fred Ostrander: a Central Intelligence Agency (C.I.A.) operative. He is an American black.
- Abd-el-Kader: the chief of the Ouled Touameur clan of the Berazga division of the Chaambra nomad confederation. He is Homer Crawford's “barbarian” antagonist.

== Major themes ==
=== The meeting of East and West ===
The novella's title refers to Rudyard Kipling’s poem on the convergence of two seemingly opposed cultural traditions, "The Ballad of East and West." In Kipling’s ballad, two warriors from conflicting civilizations come to value each other’s courage and so become blood brothers in spite of their disparate backgrounds. In Border, Breed nor Birth, the introductory blurb (“Kipling said those things didn't count when two strong men stood face to face. But ... do they count when two strong ideologies stand face to face...?”) indicates that the culture clash is between the freemarket capitalism represented by C.I.A. Fred Ostrander and the Soviet socialism represented by David Moroka. Their antagonism is temporarily resolved when they both recognize each other as equally committed to their African ancestry and to the unification of North Africa. In contrast, the clash between Homer Crawford's dream of a progressive Africa and Abd-el-Kader's adoption of Islamic fundamentalism at the end of the novella offers little hope of a possible meeting of these two enemies.

=== Turncoat heroism ===
The turncoat hero is a recurring figure in Reynolds work, especially in his many stories dealing with underground movements in the Soviet Bloc and the United States (see, for instance, the short story "Freedom"). Just as Crawford and his group renounced their jobs, parties, and countries in Black Man's Burden to follow their dream of modernizing the continent of their racial heritage, in Border, Breed nor Birth both C.I.A. operative Fred Ostrander and Soviet agent David Moroka turn against their governments and set their ideologies aside to join El Hassan's cause.

=== The beneficent tyrant ===
Border, Breed nor Birth follows the transformation of Dr. Homer Crawford, sociologist, into El Hassan, "the mythic hero of a united African revolution." Initially, El Hassan’s heroic identity seems to rest on his imperial dream as well as his outstanding military strategy, as Crawford’s followers alternatively compare him to Alexander, Caesar, Napoleon, Genghis Khan, and Tamerlane. However, as Crawford's chosen name (in Arabic, "Hassan" may mean "doer of good") indicates, what distinguishes Crawford as a tyrant is his idealistic dream of bettering North Africa's lot in spite of what North Africans want. In fact, when Crawford despairs at having to become an autocrat, Elmer Allen indicates his belief that Crawford will be a beneficent despot by reciting a stanza from Lord Byron's poem “The Isles of Greece” that describes to the tyrant Miltiades as "freedom's best and bravest friend."

== Publication history and reception ==
Border, Breed nor Birth was originally published as a two-part series in Analog Science Fiction and Fact (July and August 1962). In 1972, Ace Books reprinted it along with the first book in the sequence, Black Man's Burden, as part of its Ace Double series which features a tête-bêche format (ACE Numbers 06612 and 06612b).

The readers of Analog voted Border, Breed nor Birth as the second best story of its issues in the magazine's Analytical Laboratory (AnLab) poll. The popularity of Border, Breed nor Birth and Black Man's Burden prompted Reynolds to write "Black Sheep Astray" for the short-story collection Astounding: John W. Campbell Memorial Anthology, a special tribute by thirteen Astounding authors to the memory of science fiction and fantasy magazine editor John W. Campbell.
