= Black Man's Burden =

1962 novel by Mack Reynolds

- First book edition
- Author: Mack Reynolds
- Language: English
- Genre: Science Fiction
- Publisher: Ace Books
- Publication place: United States
- Media type: Print (Serial, Paperback)
- Pages: 137
- Followed by: Border, Breed nor Birth

Black Man's Burden is a science fiction novel by American writer Mack Reynolds. It is the first in a sequence of near-future stories set in North Africa, which also includes Border, Breed nor Birth (1962), "Black Sheep Astray" (1973), and The Best Ye Breed (1978). Black Man's Burden and its sequels have been called a "notable exception" to the indirect treatment of racial issues in 1960s science fiction magazines.

== Plot summary ==
Posing as low-caste itinerant smiths selling wares, the all-black fieldworkers of the Reunited Nations team led by sociologist Dr. Homer Crawford travel the Sahara subtly subverting the culture of its nomad tribes by disseminating "progressive" Western propaganda such as the right to equality, liberty, and the pursuit of happiness with the long-term objective of leading North Africa into the modern age. Knowing the peoples they encounter may label their teachings as blasphemous, the fieldworkers attribute them to El Hassan, an imaginary leader who has incorporated the wisdom of all the sages and prophets of the world. On their way back from working at a Tuareg encampment, the fieldworkers are attacked by an Arab Union convoy trespassing on Reunited Nations territory and, in defending themselves, kill all the Arab troopers. The team then proceeds to a council of nomad tribes with the intention of arresting one of its leaders, Adb-el-Kader, for ordering raids on Reunited Nations projects, and find that Adb-el-Kader is now inciting the rest of the clans to bloody rebellion. Homer Crawford challenges Adb-el-Kader to a sword duel, disables him with a judo move, and arrests him.

Next, Crawford's team travels to Timbuktu to attend a conference with other all-black teams providing foreign aid in North Africa. There, Crawford makes a case for cooperation across teams regardless of political or national background based on the fact that all the fieldworkers are of African descent and so are deeply invested in helping to advance Africa. Some fieldworkers, including Isobel Cunningham, Jake Armstrong, and Cliff Jackson of the Africa for Africans Association (AFAA) and the British agent Rex Donaldson are in favor of such coordination. Others, including a C.I.A. operative Fred Ostrander, object strongly to it. After the meeting is adjourned, Isobel and Homer discuss the points presented at the meeting with Homer admitting that their dissemination of Western ideology will ultimately destroy the present North African cultures, but that their work must continue so that Africa does not become a liability to the world. As they take a stroll, a sniper on a minaret attempts to assassinate Homer and seemingly gets away.

Crawford's team is sent to Mopti to defuse a demonstration for El Hassan. The AFAA fieldworkers tag along to observe their tactics. On the way, Homer and Isobel are perturbed by the realization that what the fieldwork of foreign aid organizations is equivalent to the white man's destruction of indigenous cultures in North America. After the job at Mopti, Homer leaves with his second-in-command, Abe Baker, for Dakar, where Homer thwarts a second assassination attempt: this time, his brandy has been laced with cyanide. At headquarters, his team is given a new assignment: to locate the mysterious subversive El Hassan so the Reunited Nations can back him as a figure under which North Africans can unite. Unsure about how to proceed, Homer requests some time to consider the mission and confers with Abe and Isobel. Abe attempts to convince Homer that he is the natural choice to become El Hassan; he then announces he is a Party member of the Soviet Complex and that he would like Homer to secretly become one, causing Homer to realize that Abe is his would-be assassin. Once exposed, Abe attempts to kill Homer. Isobel is revealed to be a Party member of the Soviet Complex also, but she refuses to help Abe kill Homer. Homer, unwillingly, kills Abe with a karate blow to the windpipe. Isobel pledges herself to Homer as the first follower of El Hassan and is given the mission to convert Jake and Cliff to the cause.

== Characters ==
- Homer Crawford (also known as Omar ben Crawf, El Hassan): the charismatic leader of the Reunited Nations African Development Project, Sahara Division team. He is an American black and an ex-Marine with a Ph.D. in Sociology from the University of Michigan. He speaks Arabic, Esperanto, French, Tamabeq, Songhoi, and Swahili.
- Abraham "Abe" Baker (also known as Abrahim el Bakr): a member of Crawford's team and his right-hand man in Black Man's Burden. He is an American black, a graduate of Columbia University, and a weapons expert. He is later revealed to be a Party member of the Soviet Complex.
- Bey-ag-Akhamouk: a member of Crawford's team. He is an African of Tuareg background who was taken to the United States at an early age, where he became an American citizen and graduated from the University of Minnesota with a degree in Political Science.
- Elmer Allen (also known as El Ma el Ainin): a member of Crawford's team. A Jamaican black with a Masters in Sociology from the University of Kingston, and a pacifist.
- Kenneth "Kenny" Ballalou (also known as Keni Ballalou): a member of Crawford's team. He is an American black from San Francisco; he speaks multiple languages.
- Rex Donaldson (also known as Dolo Anah): a fieldworker of the British Commonwealth African Department. A black citizen of the Bahamas who speaks Dogon, he is considered a "witchman" by the tribes he visits in his helio-hopper.
- Isobel Cunningham (also known as Izubahil): a member of the Africa for Africans Association (AFFA). An American black who looks like Lena Horne, she graduated from Columbia University with a master's degree in Anthropology. She speaks Arabic and Songhoi, as well as some Esperanto.
- Clifford "Cliff" Jackson: a member of the AFFA. An American black, he has the looks and physique of Joe Louis.
- Jake Armstrong: a member of the AFFA. An American black.
- Abd-el-Kader: the chief of the Ouled Touameur clan of the Berazga division of the Chaambra nomad confederation. He is Homer Crawford’s “barbarian” antagonist.

== Major themes ==
=== The black man's burden ===
The novella's title as well its epigraph ("Take up the white man's burden/Send forth the best ye breed...") indicate that the story is a play on Rudyard Kipling's 1899 poem on the civilizing mission of the colonizer, "The White Man's Burden." Written for Queen Victoria's Jubilee in 1897, and revised as a response "to resistance in the Philippines to the United States' assumption of colonial power" after the Spanish–American War of 1898., the poem's depiction of colonial government as a "burden" suggests that empires exist not for imperialist gain, but for the development of the unruly and uncivilized colonials. In Black Man's Burden, this tradition of "white imperial benevolence" is initially subverted by having black-only fieldworkers foment economic and technological progress in the underdeveloped regions of North Africa, and later, by Homer Crawford's decision to become El Hassan and engage in nation-building rather than continue promoting the imperial interests of the West.

=== Racial issues ===
Black Man's Burden and its sequels are considered exceptional for their direct treatment of "politically pertinent" racial issues "virtually untouched in sf" before, during, and after the 1960s. Among these issues are the return of the descendants of Africans "to help bring that dark continent into the present world," the employment of blacks to take on "the white man's burden" because the local tribes are distrustful of white people, the fieldworkers' philosophical conflict between being loyal to their race or to their government, and the setting of all these conflicts in a near-future Africa. At the same time, by portraying the "ritual-taboo tribal societies" of North Africa as "backward" Black Man's Burden reproduces racial stereotypes of Africans as primitive and barbaric.

=== Turncoat heroism ===
The turncoat hero is a recurring figure in Reynolds work, especially in his many stories dealing with underground movements in the Soviet Bloc and the United States (see, for instance, the short story "Freedom"). In Black Man's Burden, several key characters follow the protagonist in deserting their original cause to engage in what adds up to an "anti-imperialist war of liberation" against their former employers, parties, and governments because they are disillusioned by "the cynical machinations of their white superiors, who are using African aid as an instrument of exploitation and as a diplomatic weapon in their 'cold war'."

=== Progress and the search for Utopia ===
One of the central themes of Reynolds' work is the subversion of a society's status quo in the name of socioeconomic progress (see, for example, the short story "Ultima Thule"); often, this theme is tied to another key Reynolds theme, the continual search for a better society. Reynolds himself regarded the objective of his science-fiction writing as leading his readers to consider the diverse sociopolitical systems that may lead to “a more rational world.” In Black Man's Burden, the "cultural inertia" that relegates Africa to the status of a have-not region is explained as the product of two situations: the fractured dynamics of African society, which is composed of micro-cultures at different stages of socio-economic development ranging from savagery and barbarism (as defined by Lewis H. Morgan's theory of social evolution in his Ancient Society) through feudalism to capitalism; the conflicting interests of the United States, the Soviet Complex, and the Arab Union in dominating the region.

When the fieldworkers realize their development projects are in danger of being co-opted or destroyed by outside interests, they decide to revolutionize Africa by having one of their own become a provisional hero who can rally the region's disparate cultures, oppose all foreign interests, and promote technological, scientific, and educational development. As in other Reynolds' works, to be capable of effecting these changes, the hero must represent the best and brightest of the human (see, for example, the novella Frigid Fracas); in Black Man's Burden, Homer Crawford is chosen to become El Hassan specifically because he is intelligent, highly educated, progressive, altruistic, and has no cultural or political affiliations. Crawford also has a dream for North Africa: the search for Utopia. He cautions, however, that Utopia is “a goal that recedes as you approach, which is as it should be,” revealing that Reynolds’ notion of Utopia, like his idea of human progress, depends on constant striving for a better future.

== Publication history and reception ==
Black Man's Burden was originally published as a two-part series in Analog Science Fiction and Fact (December 1961 and January 1962). In 1972, Ace Books reprinted it along with the second book in the sequence, Border, Breed nor Birth, as part of its Ace Double series which features a tête-bêche format (ACE Numbers 06612 and 06612b). The first two words in the title were combined, creating the modified title Blackman's Burden.

The readers of Analog voted Black Man's Burden as the best story of its issue in the magazine's Analytical Laboratory (AnLab) poll. The story's popularity with readers prompted Analog's editor, John Campbell, to request Reynolds for a sequel, which he delivered with Border, Breed nor Birth.
