= The Best Ye Breed =

1978 novel by Mack Reynolds

- First edition
- Author: Mack Reynolds
- Cover artist: Davis Meltzer
- Language: English
- Genre: Science Fiction
- Publisher: Ace Books
- Publication date: March 1978
- Publication place: United States
- Media type: Print (Paperback)
- Pages: 279
- Preceded by: Border, Breed nor Birth

The Best Ye Breed is a science fiction novella by American writer Mack Reynolds. It is the third in a sequence of near-future stories set in North Africa, which also includes Black Man's Burden (1961-1962), Border, Breed nor Birth (1962), and "Black Sheep Astray" (1973). The Best Ye Breed and the North Africa series have been called a "notable exception" to the indirect treatment of racial issues in 1960s science fiction magazines.

== Plot ==
In parallel stories, four operatives are given conflicting missions in response to the North African war of liberation headed by black American sociologist Homer Crawford, also known as El Hassan. Counter espionage agent Paul Kosloff is dispatched by the U.S. State Department to stop Crawford's revolution before it brings about the financial collapse of the developed world, Major Sean Ryan is hired by the Arab Union to lead a mercenary team in the assassination of Crawford and his followers, Japanese Colonel Tokugawa Hidetada is commissioned to investigate Crawford's stance toward trade with Japan, and KGB agent Serge Sverdlov is sent to promote Crawford's program for North Africa to ensure that the region will be ripe for Soviet propaganda in the future.

Meantime, having scored a victory over the Arab Union forces in Tamanrasset, Crawford and his team turn to governmental issues, which include naming their new country Ifriqiyah and the creation of a Desert Camel Corps to defend the progressive field projects sponsored by El Hassan. Crawford then leaves the administration of the government temporarily in the hands of Isobel Cunningham, who is to pretend that El Hassan and his closest viziers are in a secluded planning session. In actuality, Crawford, Bey-ag-Akhamouk, Kenneth Ballalou, and Clifford Jackson go on a mission to save teammate Elmer Allen, who has been captured by one of Crawford's enemies, the leader of the Ouled Touameur clan, Abd-el-Kader. Allen is kept in a portable iron cage at the council of chiefs of the Chaambra confederation, which has been convened so that Abd-el-Kader can be proclaimed as the reincarnation of Mahdi, the holiest prophet since Mohammed. On their arrival to the council, Crawford challenges Abd-el-Kader to combat. When Abd-el-Kader refuses, Bey proposes that El Hassan and two of his men fight the one thousand warriors of Abd-el-Kader's clan in a secluded area. When the chiefs balk at this outlandish suggestion, Crawford seems to think the idea over and suggests he and his men fight the one thousand men three warriors at a time. After twenty-seven clan champions fail to emerge victorious from the arena, Abd-el-Kader's men turn their backs on him and Abd-el-Kader is laughed off the encampment. Later, Bey explains to Kenny that Crawford and Cliff used a small clearance after the narrow path leading to the fighting area to ambush Abd-el-Kader's warriors one by one.

The evening after liberating Allen, Crawford meets first with Serge Sverdlov, who offers Soviet weapons aid, and later with Paul Kosloff, who pretends he is interested in Crawford's cause to scout the place for his assassination attempt. Sverdlov then attempts to kill Kosloff, but is interrupted by Crawford and his men and by Tokugawa Hidetada. Sverdlov shoots Hidetada, who hits Bey with his laser beam. Kosloff's assistant then kills Sverdlov. Hidetada dies. In disgust at the deadly outcome, Kosloff resigns his mission.

Meantime, Major Ryan and his mercenary group have joined the foreign delegations in Tamanrasset under the pretension offering their services as bodyguards to El Hassan. When Crawford returns and asks them to leave his territory, two of their number who have warmed up to El Hassan's cause, Doctor Megan McDaid and Sergeant Lon Charles, decide to stay. After Ryan's team has left town, Sergeant Charles reveals that the mercenaries' real plan was to lay down fission grenades to destroy Tamanrasset and everyone in it, but that the grenades are now in his possession. Crawford decides to send a message to all such unscrupulous adventurers by going after the twenty-three mercenaries with twenty-two of his men and having the ensuing battle covered by the foreign news agencies in Tamanrasset. Crawford's men win the battle, only to learn that the Arab Union has declared war on Ifriqiyah.

== Major themes ==
=== The rejection of white supremacy ===
The novella's title comes from the second line of Rudyard Kipling’s 1899 poem on the civilizing mission of the white colonizer, "The White Man's Burden." Written for Queen Victoria's Jubilee in 1897, and revised as a response "to resistance in the Philippines to the United States' assumption of colonial power" after the Spanish–American War of 1898., the poem's depiction of whites as having the responsibility to rule the nonwhite peoples of the world with beneficence implies the superiority of the white race. In The Best Ye Breed, this notion of white supremacy is rejected at the socioeconomic level when Crawford and his men reveal to Paul Kosloff that they wish to undermine the West's "mad system" of a "waste economy," which necessitates the voracious exploitation of Africa's raw materials and thereby denies Africa the ability to develop; at the historical level, when Isobel Cunningham instructs Sergeant Charles on the fact that North Africa is the origin of civilization; at the cultural level when Doctor Megan McDaid distances herself from Major Ryan's white mercenaries, one of whom is her fiancé, and explains herself by reciting the first two lines of Kipling's poem to indicate that Ryan and his men are the worst the white race can offer; and at the anthropological level when Crawford deploys exactly twenty-three nonwhites to battle the twenty-three white mercenaries to reverse the message that "a handful of whites [are] worth hundreds of blacks."

=== Turncoat heroism ===
The turncoat hero is a recurring figure in Reynolds work, especially in his many stories dealing with underground movements in the Soviet Bloc and the United States (see, for instance, the short story "Freedom"). While in the earlier installments of the series, Black Man's Burden and Border, Breed nor Birth, the turncoat heroes were always highly educated blacks buying into the dream of modernizing the continent of their racial heritage, in The Best Ye Breed the dream is extended to both less educated blacks in the figure of Vietnam veteran Sergeant Lon Charles as well as to historically oppressed whites as represented by Doctor Megan McDaid, who back at home has a hard time finding work because she is a woman and whose Irish heritage helps her understand the need of a peoples to fight for their independence.

=== The slipperiness of ideology ===
Reynolds' work often features organizations or agents finding themselves acting against their espoused worldview (see, for example, the short stories "Subversive" and "Pacifist"). In The Best Ye Breed, this ironic shift in ideology occurs when Sverdlov, a Soviet agent, is sent to help El Hassan overthrow North Africa's Marxist governments while Kosloff, a Western agent, is sent to stop the El Hassan program, even though Homer Crawford is anti-Soviet.

=== Third-World independence ===
In The Best Ye Breed, the "totally unbought and unbuyable" Crawford argues that underdeveloped nations such as Ifriqiyah have to become radically independent from the first-world powers (here, capitalism and Soviet communism). Total independence would require refusing financial and technological foreign aid and charging the first-world properly for the access to raw materials they require from the third world, even if it means the collapse of the world economy.

== Publication history and reception ==
While The Best Ye Breed picks up where Border, Breed nor Birth (1962) left off, it was published after a sixteen-year hiatus and five years after Reynolds published the short story "Black Sheep Astray" (1973), which ends the series.

One of the storylines of The Best Ye Breed reuses Reynolds' 1973 short story "The Cold War...Continued," which follows the cross-purpose missions of special agents Kosloff, Sverdlov, and Hidetada in response to a revolution in North Africa. The revised storyline expands the backstories of agents Tokugawa Hidetada and Serge Sverdlov and explains Sverdlov's mission as preparing North Africa for a Soviet takeover in the long term. As a consequence of Reynolds' elaboration of previous material, The Best Ye Breed has been deemed, one the one hand, as "a pointless exercise" in "story -inflation", and, on the other, as "the best of the three [North Africa] novels" because it enhances the original story's ironic point about the slipperiness of ideology (see "Major Themes" above).
