= Childe Cycle =

Unfinished book series by Gordon R. Dickson

The Childe Cycle is an unfinished series of science fiction novels by American writer Gordon R. Dickson. The name Childe Cycle is an allusion to "Childe Roland to the Dark Tower Came", a poem by Robert Browning, which provided inspiration for elements in the work. The series is sometimes referred to as the Dorsai series, after the Dorsai people who are central to it. The related short stories and novellas all center on the Dorsai, primarily members of the Graeme and Morgan families.

In addition to the six science fiction novels of the Cycle, Dickson had also planned three historical novels and three novels taking place in the present day. In an essay from his book Steel Brother, Dickson describes how he conceived the Childe Cycle, a panoramic and "consciously thematic" treatment of the evolution of the human race, along with the planned content of the six never-written novels. Each group of three novels would include one focused on each of three "archetypes, the Philosopher, the Warrior, or the Faith-Holder". The first novel's protagonist would be mercenary John Hawkwood, who lived from the 1320s to 1394. Hawkwood "has been referred to as the first of the modern generals". He defeated a Milanese ruler who might have stymied the Renaissance. The second historical novel was to deal with the poet John Milton (author of Paradise Lost) in the period he served as a "Faith-Holder" and "Fanatic", a "propagandist for the Cromwellian government". The third historical novel's focus would have been on Robert Browning whose "poetry is a vehicle for his philosophy". The three twentieth century novels would have focused on: "the life and character of George Santayana to showcase a Philosopher", a World War II "Warrior", and a female "Faith-Holder" in the 1980s. The latter novel was expected to deal with issues of space colonization, beginning a thread continuing through Necromancer and concluding with the full formation of the Splinter Cultures.

As originally envisioned, the Cycle was to stretch from the 14th century to the 24th century; the completed books begin in the 21st century. The cycle deals with the conflict between progress and conservatism. It also deals with the interaction and conflict among humanity's traits, most importantly Courage, Faith, and Philosophy.

== Novels and shorter works ==
The science fiction novels of the main Childe Cycle include:

- Dorsai! (alternate title: The Genetic General) (1959)
- Necromancer (1962; issued under the title No Room for Man between 1963 and 1974)
- Soldier, Ask Not (1967)
- Tactics of Mistake (1971)
- The Final Encyclopedia (1984)
- The Chantry Guild (1988)

The final book, to have been titled Childe, had not been completed at the time of Dickson's death in 2001, and has never been published. Dickson's essay in Steel Brother says it was to chronicle a battle "in which the adventurous part of the id family wins its identity over the conservative part, and the human identity is made whole again".

In addition, there are four shorter pieces and three novels that take place in the same fictional universe as the Childe Cycle, but are not part of the core cycle.

- Lost Dorsai (novella) and "Warrior" (short story), published together in Lost Dorsai (1980)
- Amanda Morgan (novella) and "Brothers" (short story), published together in The Spirit of Dorsai (1979)

In the latter volume, the stories are framed by a conversation between Hal Mayne and Amanda Morgan during the events of The Final Encyclopedia. "Warrior" (1965) and "Brothers" (1973) had previously appeared in other publications. The four works have since been collected in one volume as The Dorsai Companion (1986).

The three other novels are:

- Young Bleys (1991)
- Other (1994)
- Antagonist (with David W. Wixon; 2007)

These three novels concern the background and development of Bleys Ahrens, the antagonist of The Final Encyclopedia and The Chantry Guild. They take place in the decades leading up to those books, and were added to the original series outline to provide more detail of the ultimate conflict in Childe. The year 2007 saw the publication of Antagonist, finished by Dickson's long-time assistant David W. Wixon.

The first published reference to the Dorsai appeared in "Lulungomeena", a 1954 short story published in Galaxy Science Fiction and later dramatized on the X Minus One radio program. The narrator is a man from "the Dorsai planets," who has been working far from home for a long time. The story portrays the Dorsai people as tough and matter-of-fact, but says little else about them.

== Chronology ==
The main sequence novels fall into four periods, approximately a century apart.

- Necromancer: Late 21st century, shortly before humanity begins star travel
- Tactics of Mistake: Late 22nd century, in the early development of the splinter cultures. Amanda Morgan takes place at the same time as the crisis of this book.
- Soldier, Ask Not and Dorsai! occur around the same time as each other, and overlap, with some events described in both novels. Late 23rd century, after the splinter cultures have fully developed.
- The Final Encyclopedia, followed by The Chantry Guild: Mid-24th century, as the final conflict develops among the cultures.
- The final planned volume, Childe, was to resolve the conflict which had been set up in the last two books. Its events would immediately follow the events of The Chantry Guild.

== Splinter cultures ==
By the late 21st century, human culture began to fragment into different aspects. Following the events of Necromancer, humanity has colonized some 14 Younger Worlds. The inhabitants of these worlds have evolved culturally, and to some extent, genetically, into several specialized Splinter Cultures. This was done by the racial collective unconscious itself as an experiment to see what aspects of humanity are the most important. The inhabitants of Earth (now called Old Earth, since New Earth is one of the Younger Worlds) remain "full spectrum humans" as a control.

The interstellar economy is based on the exchange of specialists, which puts Old Earth, the jack of all trades, at something of a disadvantage.

Of all the Splinter Cultures, three are the most successful:

- The Dorsai (Courage): The Dorsai, inhabitants of a Younger World also called Dorsai, are honorable, elite mercenaries. Given the book-selling nature of their occupation, the Childe Cycle focuses mainly on their exploits, to the extent that the Cycle is sometimes called the "Dorsai series". The culture tends to have several Gaelic influences, including a love for the bagpipes, although their ancestry is drawn from all races and cultures. Dickson also mentioned in lectures that the "ethnic food" of the Dorsai is fish and chips, due to the great amount of surface water and oceans on their homeworld, with mutton being the most common red meat in the Dorsai diet.
- The Exotics (Philosophy): The Exotics are the inhabitants of Mara and Kultis. They are peaceful philosophers, the descendants of the 21st century Chantry Guild. The traits which Dickson assigns to the Exotics in many ways mirror the Human Potential Movement of the 1960s, in combining elements of Eastern philosophy and religion with psychology. The Exotics have some vaguely described level of paranormal powers. They can, among other things, communicate between star systems far more quickly than a ship can travel, an ability no other culture has. The Exotics hire themselves out as psychiatrists and mediators, among other things. The paranormal ability of the Exotics is never shown definitively (save for Donal levitating with Exotic encouragement in Dorsai! and the events of Necromancer), and The Final Encyclopedia reveals that their rapid communications ability is based on the use of a carefully hidden network of spaceships used innovatively, rather than on paranormal abilities.
- The Friendlies (Faith/Fanaticism): The somewhat ironically named Friendlies inhabit the worlds of Harmony and Association. Friendlies can be true faith-holders, or they can be fanatics. The difference, according to the Cycle, is that true faith-holders are guided by their faith, while fanatics use their faith to justify their actions. The Friendly homeworlds experience continual sectarian civil war. On their home planets, they are primarily agrarian, but, like the Dorsai, they earn interstellar credit as mercenaries, fighting in other people's wars. Unlike the Dorsai, Friendly mercenaries are drafted as cannon-fodder, with largely green troops and high casualty rates. However, they are tenacious defenders. While the Friendlies are sometimes presented as villains, their faith is co-equal in importance to humanity with the Courage of the Dorsai and the Philosophy of the Exotics. A recurring theme in the series is the experience of a young man placed among Friendlies, forced to gain respect for them. Dickson based the Friendlies on Oliver Cromwell's "Roundheads" of the English Civil War.

Other Splinter Cultures include the hard scientists of Newton and Venus, the miners of Coby, the fishermen of Dunnin's World, the engineers of Cassida, the Catholic farmers of St. Marie, and the merchants of Ceta.

The internal consistency of the series suggests that the resolution to be sought in Childe is the evolution of Responsible Man, individuals who integrate the three disciplines of the Dorsai, the Exotics, and the Friendlies to the overall advancement of humanity, and who do possess explicit if not yet well-defined paranormal abilities. As of The Chantry Guild, only Donal Graeme/Hal Mayne has achieved the full status of Responsible Man. The conflict which drives this evolution is the developing war between Old Earth, supplemented by the Dorsai and the Exotics, and the organization of Others led by Bleys Ahrens, with the aid of the Friendlies and a powerful (but largely irrelevant to the psychological conflict) coalition of the technically inclined younger worlds. The strength of the Others is that they are hybrids of two of the Splinter Cultures (Ahrens is of Friendly and Exotic extraction), and while less capable than the emerging Responsible Men they are significantly more numerous, and more interested in gaining power for themselves (as by Ahrens using his combined background to manipulate the entire Friendly culture to support his war against the Dorsai, Exotics, and Old Earth).

== Planets of the Childe Cycle ==
Dickson has admitted that he was frequently inconsistent on the total number of inhabited worlds. The correct total is sixteen, under nine stars (counting Alpha Centauri A and B separately). Some uninhabited planets also play a role in the series.

- Sol
  - Mercury: Site of Project Springboard during the 21st century. Not a major inhabited world.
  - Venus: Hard science culture. Research stations were set up early, expanded, and eventually became connected.
  - Old Earth: Homeworld of humanity, and most populated and richest of the worlds. Politically, not very united.
  - Mars: First human colony to be terraformed. Cold and is not a major power.
- Alpha Centauri: Has 12 planetary bodies.
  - Newton: Hard science culture, the leading world in science. It is also known to have the best physicists.
  - Cassida: Hard science culture, known for its technicians and engineers. A poor world it also provided mercenaries.
- Altair
  - Dunnin's World: A harsh, dry world with low population and resources.
- Epsilon Eridani: Both Harmony and Association are ruled by the Joint Church Council (United Council of Churches). The two worlds are known for their cheap but poor mercenaries.
  - Association: Poor world, lacking in many resources and has poor soil for growing crops.
  - Harmony: Similar to Association.
- Fomalhaut
  - Dorsai: A watery world of primarily island settlements. Known for having the highest quality professional mercenaries, and for producing soldiers unlike any other.
- Procyon: Mara and Kultis are ruled by the Exotics, and are known for producing the best psychologists.
  - Mara
  - Kultis
  - Ste. Marie: A small Roman Catholic farming world.
  - Zombri: An uninhabitable small world. Despite this, it is a strategic location.
  - Coby: Mining planet. A world of tunnels and mines, where the surface is uninhabitable. Since all the other settled worlds, unlike Earth, are metal-poor, Coby is the primary source of metals for the other planets.
- Sirius
  - New Earth: Once had an atmosphere of hydrogen sulphide. By the late 23rd Century, it had long been terraformed with a more breathable atmosphere. Has a large variety of cultures. Atland, a territory of New Earth, had a civil war fought between the North and South Partitions.
  - Freiland
  - Oriente: an uninhabited planet, airless with a highly eccentric orbit. It is important only as a strategic military base in Dorsai!
- Tau Ceti
  - Ceta: Commercial low-gravity planet.

== Awards ==
Year	Award	Category	Work	Result	Ref.
1960	1960 Hugo Awards	Best Novel	Dorsai!	Nominated	
1965	1965 Hugo Awards	Best Short Fiction	"Soldier, Ask Not" (Note: The award-winning 1964 novella was later expanded to the novel of the same title published in 1967.)	Won	
1971	1971 Locus Awards	Best Novel	Tactics of Mistake	8	
1974	1974 Locus Awards	Best Short Fiction	"Brothers"	13	
1981	1980 Nebula Awards	Best Novella	"Lost Dorsai"	Nominated	
1981	1981 Hugo Awards	Best Novella	"Lost Dorsai"	Won	
1981	1981 Locus Awards	Best Novella	"Lost Dorsai"	8	
1981	1981 Locus Awards	Best Single Author Collection	Lost Dorsai (Note: The nominated collection includes the separately nominated novella of the same title.)	12	
1985	1985 Locus Awards	Best SF Novel	The Final Encyclopedia	9	
1985	1985 Ditmar Awards	Best International Fiction	The Final Encyclopedia	Nominated	
1985	1985 Prometheus Awards	Best Novel	The Final Encyclopedia	Nominated	
