= Helix the Cat =

Short story by Theodore Sturgeon

"Helix the Cat" is a science fantasy short story by American writer Theodore Sturgeon. The story was written in 1939 or 1940 and submitted to John W. Campbell, editor of Unknown and Astounding Science Fiction magazines. The editor rejected it, as he felt it did not fit into either fantasy or science fiction categories.

The manuscript was placed in storage, thought lost by the author, and returned to him about thirty years later. It was published, without any alterations, in Astounding: The John W Campbell Memorial Anthology, in 1973.

== Plot summary ==
The story is narrated by Pete Tronti, a struggling inventor. Whilst experimenting with a new form of glass he is trying to perfect, Pete is astonished to hear a disembodied voice from within the bottle he is working with. The voice announces itself to be the soul of Wallace Gregory, who has just died in a road accident. He is hiding from Them, who search out and eat souls.

Gregory persuades Tronti to create a body for him and eventually he takes possession of the body of Helix, Tronti's pet cat. Between them, they modify Helix's body and increase his intelligence. But when Helix/Gregory start to take over Tronti's life, he decides he has no option but to kill the cat. Helix escapes and goes into business as a cat burglar.
