= The Spirit of Dorsai =

Short story collection by Gordon R. Dickson

- Cover of the first edition
- Author: Gordon R. Dickson
- Illustrator: Fernando Fernandez
- Cover artist: Enric
- Language: English
- Series: Childe Cycle
- Genre: Science fiction
- Publisher: Ace Books
- Publication date: 1979
- Publication place: United States
- Media type: Print (paperback)
- Pages: 282
- ISBN: 0-441-77802-X
- OCLC: 5944169
- Dewey Decimal: 813/.54
- LC Class: PZ4.D553 Sr PS3554.I328

The Spirit of Dorsai is a collection of two science fiction stories by American writer Gordon R. Dickson. It was first published by Ace Books in 1979. The collection includes linking material and the stories are part of Dickson's Childe Cycle. The first story, "Amanda Morgan", is original to this collection. The other, "Brothers", originally appeared in the anthology Astounding, edited by Harry Harrison.

== Contents ==
- Prologue
- "Amanda Morgan"
- Interlude
- "Brothers"
- Epilogue
