= Mack Reynolds =

American science fiction writer

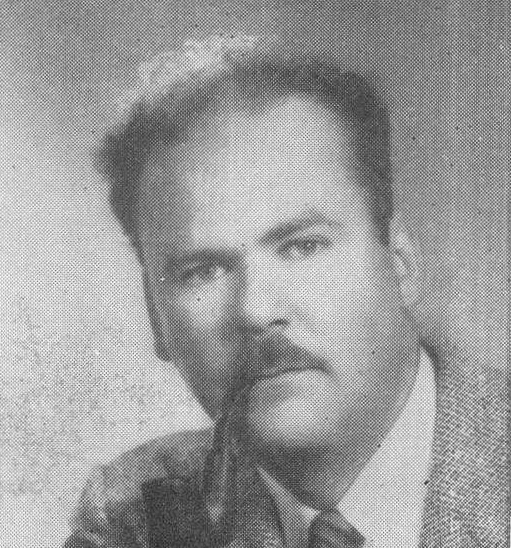
- Mack Reynolds c. 1953
- Born: Dallas McCord Reynolds; November 11, 1917; Corcoran, California, US
- Died: January 30, 1983 (aged 65)
- Other names: Clark Collins, Mark Mallory, Guy McCord, Dallas Ross and Maxine Reynolds

Dallas McCord "Mack" Reynolds (November 11, 1917 – January 30, 1983) was an American science fiction writer. His pen names included Dallas Ross, Mark Mallory, Clark Collins, Dallas Rose, Guy McCord, Maxine Reynolds, Bob Belmont, and Todd Harding. His work focused on socioeconomic speculation, usually expressed in thought-provoking explorations of utopian societies from a radical, sometime satiric perspective. He was a popular author from the 1950s to the 1970s, especially with readers of science fiction and fantasy magazines.

Reynolds was the first author to write an original novel based upon the 1966–1969 NBC television series Star Trek. The book, Mission to Horatius (1968), was aimed at young readers.

== Biography ==
Reynolds was born in Corcoran, California, the second of four children of Verne La Rue Reynolds and Pauline McCord. When the family moved to Baltimore in 1918, his father joined the Socialist Labor Party (SLP) so that from an early age Reynolds was raised to accept the tenets of Marxism and socialism. ("I was born into a Marxian Socialist family. I am the child who, at the age of five or six, said to his parent, 'Mother, who is Comrade Jesus Christ?' —for I had never met anyone in that household who wasn't called Comrade.") In 1935, while still in high school in Kingston, New York, Reynolds joined the SLP and became an active advocate of the party's goals. The following year, he toured the country with his father giving lectures and speeches, and became recognized as a significant force in advocating the SLP.

After graduating from high school, Reynolds worked as a reporter for the Catskill Morning Star from 1937 to 1938 and as editor of the weekly Oneonta News from 1939 to 1940. In 1937, he married his first wife, Evelyn Sandell, with whom he had three children, Emil, La Verne, and Dallas Mack Jr. From 1940 to 1943 Reynolds worked for IBM at the San Pedro, California Shipyards. He also worked actively as an organizer for the SLP, campaigning with SLP presidential candidate John W. Aiken in 1940. After attending the U.S. Army Marine Officer's Cadet School and the U.S. Marine Officer's School, he joined the U.S. Army Transportation Corps in 1944 and was stationed in the Philippines as a ship's navigator until 1945. Upon returning home from the Corps, Reynolds learned that Evelyn had become involved with another man. They divorced and she took their children with her.

From 1946 to 1949, Reynolds worked as a national organizer for the SLP. In 1946, he made his first fiction sale, "What is Courage?", to Esquire magazine. A year later, he met a woman who shared his radical politics, Helen Jeanette Wooley. They were married in September 1947, and Jeanette agreed to support Reynolds for two years while he pursued a career as a writer for the detective pulps. After searching for a place with a low cost of living, they moved to Taos, New Mexico, where Reynolds met science fiction writers Walt Sheldon and Fredric Brown. Brown, later one of Reynolds' frequent collaborators, convinced Reynolds to shift from writing detective stories to writing science fiction. Reynolds' first sale of a science fiction story, "Last Warning" (also known as "The Galactic Ghost"), sold to Planet Stories in June 1949 but was not printed until 1954. His first published science fiction story, "Isolationist" appeared in Fantastic Adventures in June 1950. His career soon took off, resulting in a sale of 18 stories in 1950 alone. In 1951, he published his first novel, The Case of the Little Green Men, a mix of the murder-mystery and science fiction genres that became "an instant classic of science-fiction-fan related fiction."

In 1953, the Reynoldses moved to San Miguel de Allende, in Guanajuato, Mexico, where they lived for only eighteen months before embarking on a journey through Europe and the East that lasted almost ten years and included stays in Greece, Yugoslavia, Algeria, Morocco, Spain, Eastern Europe, Finland, India, Japan, and Hong Kong. In 1955, Reynolds became a correspondent for Rogue magazine and began making money writing about his travels as well as from his science fiction stories, whose socioeconomic speculations now reflected the insights gained from his encounters with other cultures. In 1958, he became a choice writer for John W. Campbell's Astounding Science Fiction, remaining its "most prolific contributor" for the next ten years. The same year, the publication of How to Retire without Money, to which Reynolds contributed under the byline Bob Belmont, led the National Executive Committee of the SLP to charge Reynolds with "supporting the fraudulent claims of capitalist apologists, viz, that capitalism offers countless opportunities to those who are 'alert'" and caused Reynolds to resign his membership from the SLP.

The 1960s saw some of Reynolds' best work, including the short stories "Revolution," "Combat," "Freedom," "Subversive," and "Mercenary" (which became the first installment of the Joe Mauser series), the Homer Crawford serials "Black Man's Burden" and "Border, Breed nor Birth," and the novellas "Adaptation," "Ultima Thule" (both part of the United Planet series), and "Status Quo" (a Hugo nominee). In 1963, he published The Expatriates, a mix of travel memories and autobiographical material emphasizing the benefits of living outside the United States. From 1961 to 1964, Reynolds, at the request of his agent, wrote five sex novels: Episode on the Riviera, A Kiss before Loving, This Time We Love, The Kept Woman, and The Jet Set.

In 1965, the Reynolds returned to San Miguel de Allende to live. Their house on Nuñez 32 soon became a familiar haunt of the artistic community, often frequented by renowned authors. While Reynolds continued to write and sell science fiction stories, by 1969 his sales began to decline and several of his novels were held back during a takeover of Ace Books in 1970 and not published until 1975. During this difficult period of his life, Reynolds wrote two romance novels, The House in the Kasbah and The Home of the Inquisitor, under the byline Maxine Reynolds. He also began his most ambitious undertaking, a series of stories envisioning life in the year 2000. Looking Backward from the Year 2000 and Equality: In the Year 2000 updated and critiqued the socialist utopias created by Edward Bellamy in Looking Backward: 2000-1887 and Equality, which had helped shape Reynolds' radical worldview at an early age. Commune 2000 A.D., The Towers of Utopia, and Rolltown and the Lagrangia series explored marginal utopian colonies on earth and in space, respectively. In 1976, the short story collection The Best of Mack Reynolds was published.

By the end of the 1970s, Reynolds was having trouble getting his manuscripts published. One month before his death in 1983, as he was recuperating from cancer surgery, his new agent negotiated a contract with Tor Books. By 1986, eleven of his books had been published posthumously, five of them revised and co-authored by Dean Ing, and two more by Michael A. Banks. The New England Science Fiction Association, which had invited Reynolds to be its Guest of Honor at Boskone XX (February 1983), published the collection Compounded Interests to be released as part of his appearance, but Reynolds died three weeks before the convention. In it, Reynolds identifies his Star Trek novel Mission to Horatius as his "bestseller."

== Major themes ==
While Reynolds' fiction spans an array of science fiction elements including time travel, alien visitation, world computers, Amazonian cultures, and intergalactic spy adventures, his radical interrogation of socioeconomic systems sets him apart from other science fiction writers. Accordingly, many of Reynolds' original contributions to science fiction exist in the form of sociological predictions, some of which have come to pass: the credit-card economy, a worldwide computer network with information available at one's fingertips, a "Common Europe," a basic guaranteed income for every citizen, mobile cities, or global societies with a universal religion and an Esperanto-based common language.

=== Alternative socio-economic systems ===
Reynolds sought to shake his readers' complacent acceptance of Cold War capitalism by depicting a variety of post-capitalist near futures, many of which he envisioned could occur around the year 2000. His stories, therefore, cover an assortment of social systems including anarchy, communism, technocracy, syndicalism, meritocracy, various forms of socialism, and an extrapolation of free-enterprise economics, People's Capitalism. In addition, some of his stories set up a rivalry between a collective and a competitive economy in order to assess their respective merits, sometimes coming to the conclusion that they cannot be compared except for their imperialistic aims, as in the novella Adaptation, while at other times both systems are revealed to be equally decadent and stagnant, as in the Joe Mauser story "Frigid Fracas". Reynolds' novella "Radical Center" (1967) – portraying radical centrism as a conspiracy of the powerful to render ordinary citizens non-judgmental and apathetic – became the lead story in a university textbook, American Government Through Science Fiction.

=== Trouble in Utopia ===
Reynolds has been called a "cautious," "critical," or "ambiguous" Utopian writer because his many explorations of ideal societies, such as his updates of Edward Bellamy's Looking Backward: 2000-1887 and Equality, focus as much on Utopia's dilemmas as on its benefits. Typically, Reynolds' Utopias are worlds of almost complete industrial automation so that no one needs to work, everyone lives in security thanks to a guaranteed basic income, and those who volunteer for the few jobs left are chosen via a quantitative ability test. At the same time, the population's very life of leisure has led to species stasis by discouraging the continual striving that gives humanity its purpose as in the story "Utopian," or the Utopian welfare state has metamorphosed into a caste society where those in power aim to keep it, blocking for its other members the opportunity to exert themselves to the full extent of their abilities, as in the Joe Mauser series.

=== The continuous revolution ===
Reynolds' heroes usually seek to improve their societies by direct revolutionary action. Sometimes their revolution is meant to advance a people's level of civilization, as in the case of the North Africa series; sometimes it aims to upset a Utopian society where, while there is no want, inequality, or conflict, there is also no sense of purpose, as in the novel After Utopia, or possibility of social mobility, as in the Joe Mauser series. Usually, once a revolution has succeeded in subverting the status quo, another revolution follows and subverts it, as in the story "Black Sheep Astray," giving the impression that social change is as endless as it is progressive.

== Bibliography ==
The short fiction section of this list includes first publications only. For a more complete list of Reynolds' publications, including translations, see "Mack Reynolds" at The Internet Speculative Fiction Database.

=== Short fiction ===
==== 1950s ====
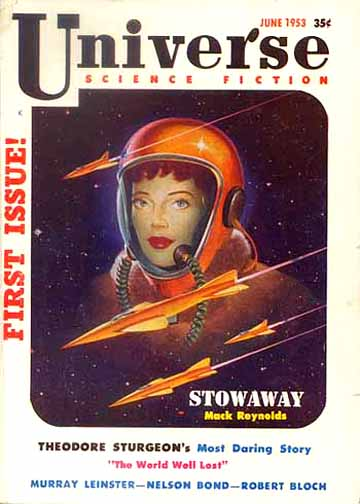
Reynolds's novelette "Stowaway" was the cover story in the debut issue of Universe Science Fiction in June 1953

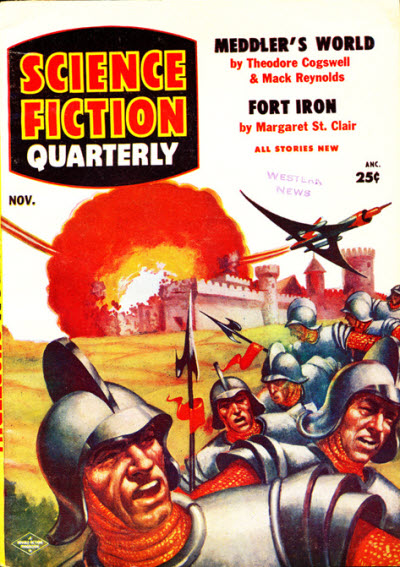
"Meddler's World", a novelette by Reynolds and Theodore Cogswell, was the cover story on the November 1955 issue of Science Fiction Quarterly

- "Isolationist", Fantastic Adventures, Apr. 1950.
- "He Took It with Him" (as Clark Collins), Fantastic Adventures, Apr. 1950.
- "United We Stand", Amazing, May 1950.
- "Fido", Fantastic Adventures, May 1950.
- "Luvver", Fantastic Adventures, June 1950.
- "Precognition", Thrilling Wonder Stories, June 1950.
- "The Discord Makers", Out of This World Adventures, July 1950.
- "The Man in the Moon", Amazing, July 1950.
- "Down the River", Startling Stories, Sept. 1950.
- "The Word from the Void", Super Science Stories, Sept. 1950.
- "You Might Say Virginia Dared" (as Dallas Ross), Amazing, Sept. 1950.
- "Give the Devil His Due" (as Dallas Ross), Fantastic Adventures, Oct. 1950.
- "Long Beer, Short Horn", Fantastic Adventures, Nov. 1950.
- "Tall Tale", Startling Stories, Nov. 1950.
- "One of Our Planets Is Missing!", Amazing Stories, Nov. 1950.
- "The Devil Finds Work", Fantastic Adventures, Dec. 1950.
- "The Spark", Thrilling Wonder Stories, Dec. 1950.
- "Tourists to Terra", Imagination, Dec. 1950.
- "Six-Legged Svengali" (with Fredric Brown), Worlds Beyond, Dec. 1950.
- "Dark Interlude" (with Fredric Brown), Galaxy Science Fiction, Jan. 1951.
- "Troubador", Other Worlds Science Stories, Jan. 1951.
- "The Switcheroo" (with Fredric Brown), Other Worlds, March 1951.
- "Not in the Rules", Imagination, Apr. 1951.
- "Overtime", Thrilling Wonder Stories, Apr. 1951.
- "I'm a Stranger, Myself", Thrilling Wonder Stories, Apr. 1951.
- "Cartoonist" (with Fredric Brown), Planet Stories, May 1951. Also known as "Garrigan's BEMs."
- "Second Advent", Marvel Science Stories, May 1951.
- "The Martians and the Coys", Imagination, June 1951.
- "With this Ring..." (as Dallas Ross), Fantastic Adventures, Aug. 1951.
- "Mercy Flight", Planet Stories, July 1951.
- "Ultimate Answer" (as Dallas Ross), Thrilling Wonder Stories, Oct. 1951.
- "Displaced Person", Fantastic Story Magazine, Oct. 1951.
- "The Gamblers" (with Fredric Brown), Startling Stories, Nov. 1951.
- "Halftripper", Planet Stories, Nov. 1951.
- "He Knew All the Answers" (as Dallas Ross) Fantastic Adventures, Nov. 1951.
- "Chowhound", Marvel Science Fiction, Nov. 1951.
- "The Hatchetman" (with Frederic Brown), Amazing, Dec. 1951.
- "How Green Was My Martian", Startling Stories, Jan. 1952.
- "Your Soul Comes C.O.D.", Fantastic Adventures, Mar. 1952.
- "Final Appraisal", Other Worlds Science Stories, Mar. 1952.
- "The Business, as Usual", The Magazine of Fantasy and Science Fiction, June 1952.
- "The Cosmic Bluff", Imagination, Oct. 1952.
- "Alternate Universe", Other Worlds, Nov. 1952.
- ""Me and Flapjack and the Martians" (with Fredric Brown), Astounding, Dec. 1952.
- "Four-legged Hotfoot", Fantastic Story Magazine, Winter 1952.
- "Stowaway", Universe Science Fiction, June 1953.
- "Dogfight – 1973", Imagination, July 1953.
- "The Adventure of the Snitch in Time" (with August Derleth), The Magazine of Fantasy and Science Fiction, July 1953.
- "Advice from Tomorrow", Science Fiction Quarterly, Aug. 1953.
- "D. P. from Tomorrow", Orbit, Sep. 1953.
- "No Return from Elba", Fantastic, Sept. 1953.
- "Please to Remember", Future Science Fiction, Sept. 1953.
- "Potential Enemy", Orbit, Dec. 1953.
- "Optical Illusion", Science Stories, Dec. 1953.
- "Off Course", If, Jan. 1954.
- "A Zloor for Your Trouble!", Imagination, Jan. 1954.
- "The Other Alternative", The Magazine of Fantasy and Science Fiction, Feb. 1954.
- "The Galactic Ghost", Planet Stories, March 1954.
- "Last Warning", Planet Stories, March 1954.
- "And Thou Beside Me", The Magazine of Fantasy and Science Fiction, Apr. 1954.
- "Husbands, Care and Feeding of", Science Fiction Stories, June 1954.
- "Paradox Gained", Orbit, July–Aug. 1954.
- "Prone", The Magazine of Fantasy and Science Fiction, Sept. 1954.
- "A Dream . . . Dying", Thrilling Wonder Stories, Oct. 1954.
- "Desperate Remedy", SF Quarterly, Nov. 1954.
- "The Expert", Magazine of Fantasy and Science Fiction, Jan. 1955.
- "The Long Way Home", Imagination, Mar. 1955.
- "Albatross", Imagination, April 1955.
- "All the World Loves a Luvver", The Magazine of Fantasy and Science Fiction, Apr. 1955.
- "The Adventure of the Ball of Nostradamus" (with August Derleth), The Magazine of Fantasy and Science Fiction, June 1955.
- "Space Gamble", Imagination, July 1955.
- "Operation Triplan ", Fantastic Universe, Aug. 1955.
- "Buck and the Space War", Imaginative Tales, Sept. 1955.
- "Burnt Toast", Playboy, Nov. 1955.
- "Meddler's World", (with Theodore R. Cogswell), SF Quarterly, Nov. 1955.
- "Compleated Angler", Startling Stories, Fall 1955.
- "The Triangulated Izaak Walton", Fantastic Universe, June 1956.
- "After Some Tomorrow", If, June 1956.
- "Compounded Interest", The Magazine of Fantasy and Science Fiction, Aug. 1956.
- "Fair Exchange", Fantastic Universe, Aug. 1956.
- "Case Rests", Science Fiction Quarterly, Aug. 1956.
- "Dog Star", Science Fiction Quarterly, Nov. 1956.
- "Posted" (also as Mark Mallory), Space Science Fiction Magazine, Spring 1957.
- "Slow Djinn", Space Science Fiction Magazine, Aug. 1957.
- "Dead End", Tales of the Frightened, Aug. 1957.
- "The Man Who Stole His Body" (as Mark Mallory), Tales of the Frightened, Aug. 1957.
- "Happy Ending" (with Fredric Brown), Fantastic Universe, Sept. 1957.
- "Snafu on the New Taos", Venture Science Fiction Magazine, Sept. 1957.
- "Obedience Guaranteed", Space Science Fiction Magazine, Spring 1957.
- "Of Pot and Potter", Fantastic Universe, Jan. 1958.
- "Gladiator", The Magazine of Fantasy and Science Fiction, March 1958.
- "Sin Planet", Amazing Science Fiction, March 1958.
- "The Truth and the Image" (as Mark Mallory) Amazing Science Fiction, March 1958.
- "Alternatives, Inc.", Amazing Science Fiction Stories, May 1958.
- "Pieces of the Game", Astounding Science Fiction, Dec. 1958.
- "Unborn Tomorrow", Astounding, June 1959.
- "Toro!", Fantastic Science Fiction Stories, Sept. 1959.
- "The Hunted Ones", Science Fiction Stories, Nov. 1959.

==== 1960s ====
- "The Good Seed", Worlds of If, Jan. 1960.
- "I'm a Stranger Here Myself", Amazing Stories, Dec. 1960.
- "Russkies Go Home!", The Magazine of Fantasy and Science Fiction, Nov. 1960.
- "Summit", Astounding, Feb. 1960.
- Revolution, Astounding, May 1960.
- Adaptation (novella), Astounding, Aug. 1960.
- "Combat", Analog, Oct. 1960.
- "Medal of Honor", Amazing, Nov. 1960.
- "Gun for Hire", Analog, Dec. 1960.
- "Freedom", Analog, Feb. 1961.
- Ultima Thule (novella), Analog, Mar. 1961.
- "Farmer", Galaxy, June 1961.
- "I. Q.", Fantastic Stories of Imagination, June 1961.
- Status Quo (novella), Analog, Aug. 1961. Hugo nominee.
- "Black Man's Burden" (two part serial), Analog, Dec. 1961 – Jan. 1962.
- "Border, Breed nor Birth" (two part serial), Analog, July–Aug. 1962.
- "Mercenary", Analog, Apr. 1962.
- "Earthlings Go Home!", Rogue, Aug. 1962.
- "Good Indian", Analog, Sept. 1962.
- "Subversive", Analog, Dec. 1962.
- "Speakeasy", The Magazine of Fantasy and Science Fiction, Jan. 1963.
- "The Common Man" (also as Guy McCord) Analog, Jan. 1963.
- "Frigid Fracas" (two part serial), Analog, Mar.–Apr. 1963.
- "Expediter", Analog, May 1963.
- "Spaceman on a Spree", Worlds of Tomorrow, June 1963.
- "Pacifist", The Magazine of Fantasy and Science Fiction, Jan. 1964.
- "Genus Traitor", Analog, Aug. 1964.
- "Sweet Dreams, Sweet Princes" (three part serial), Analog, Oct.–Dec. 1964.
  - "Photojournalist", Analog, Feb. 1965.
- "Fad", Analog, Apr. 1965.
- "The Adventure of the Extra-Terrestrial" (with August Derleth), Analog, July 1965. Nebula nominee.
- "Of Godlike Powers" (two part serial), Worlds of Tomorrow, July–Aug. 1965.
- "By the Same Door", New Worlds SF, Aug. 1965.
- "Space Pioneer" (three part serial), Analog, Sept.–Nov. 1965.
- "A Leader for Yesteryear", If, Oct. 1965. Nebula nominee.
- "Last of a Noble Breed", Worlds of Tomorrow, Nov. 1965.
- "Time of War", If, Nov. 1965.
- "Beehive" (two part serial), Analog Dec. 1965 - Jan. 1966.
- "The Switcheroo Revisited", Analog, Feb. 1966.
- "Your Soul Comes C.O.D.", Fantastic, Mar. 1966.
- "Hatchetman", Impulse, June 1966.
- "Survivor", Analog, July 1966.
- "Arena", If, Sept. 1966.
- "Romp", Analog, Oct. 1966.
- "Amazon Planet" (three part serial), Analog, Dec. 1966 – Feb. 1967.
- "Radical Center", Analog, Mar. 1967.
- "Relic", The Magazine of Fantasy and Science Fiction, Mar. 1967.
- "The Enemy Within", Analog, Apr. 1967.
- "The Throwaway Age", Worlds of Tomorrow, May 1967.
- "Computer War" (two part serial), Analog, June–July 1967.
- "Depression...or Bust", Analog, Aug. 1967.
- Fiesta Brava (novella), Analog, Sept. 1967.
- "Coup" (also as Guy McCord), Analog, Nov. 1967.
- "Psi Assassin", Analog, Dec. 1967.
- "How We Banned the Bombs", Galaxy, June 1968.
- "Among the Bad Baboons", Galaxy, Aug. 1968.
- "Love Conquers All", If, Sept. 1968.
- "Where's Horatius?", Amazing, Sept. 1968.
- "What the Vintners Buy", Worlds of Fantasy, Sep. 1968.
- "Criminal in Utopia", Galaxy, Oct. 1968.
- "The Computer Conspiracy", Worlds of If, Nov–Dec. 1968.
- "Spying Season", Galaxy, Dec. 1968.
- "Krishna" (as Guy McCord), Analog, Jan. 1969.
- "Extortion, Inc.", Analog, Feb. 1969.
- "Opportunist" (as Guy McCord), Analog, Apr. 1969.
- "The Five Way Secret Agent" (two part serial), Analog, Apr.–May 1969.
- "The Towns Must Roll" (two part serial), If, July–Sept. 1969.

==== 1970s ====
- "Utopian", The Year 2000, edited by Harry Harrison, 1970.
- "City's End", Future Quest, edited by Roger Elwood, 1973.
- "Buck and the Gents from Space", Science Fiction Adventures from Way Out, edited by Roger Elwood, 1973.
- "The Cold War...Continued", Nova 3, edited by Harry Harrison, 1973.
- "Black Sheep Astray", Astounding: John W. Campbell Memorial Anthology, edited by Harry Harrison, 1973.
- "Second Advent", Worlds of If, May–June 1974.
- "Nostradamus" (as Clark Collins), Worlds of If, May–June 1974.
- "Come in, Spaceport", Go: Reading in the Content Areas. Scholastic Magazine, 1974.
- "Survival, A.D. 2000", Survival from Infinity, edited by Roger Elwood, 1974.
- "Generation Gap", Future Kin, edited by Roger Elwood, 1974.
- "Spooky", The Killer Plants and Other Stories, edited by Roger Elwood, 1974.
- "Cry Wolf!", Galaxy, Dec. 1974.
- "Visitor", Tomorrow Today, edited by George Zebrowski, 1975.
- "Of Future Fears", Analog, Oct.–Dec. 1977. Three part serial.
- "All Things to All...", Amazing Stories, May 1978.
- "A Halo for Horace", Amazing Stories, Feb. 1979.
- "The Case of the Disposable Jalopy", Analog, Oct. 1979.

==== 1980s ====
- "Hell's Fire"(with Gary Jennings), 1980.
- "Golden Rule", Analog, Mar. 1980.
- "What the Vintners Buy", Analog, Sept. 1980.
- "The Union Forever", Analog, Dec. 1980.
- "Escape Velocity", The Magazine of Fantasy & Science Fiction, Dec. 1980.
- "Closer Encounter", Isaac Asimov's Science Fiction Magazine, May 11, 1981.
- "The Hand of the Bard", Speculations, edited by Isaac Asimov and Alice Laurance, 1982.
- "Idealist", Compounded Interests, 1983.

=== Novels ===
==== 1950s ====
- The Case of the Little Green Men, 1951.

==== 1960s ====
- Episode on the Riviera, 1961.
- A Kiss before Loving: A Contemporary Novel, 1961.
- The Earth War, 1963. Reprint of "Frigid Fracas." Second book of the Joe Mauser series.
- The Kept Woman, 1963.
- The Jet Set, 1964.
- Space Pioneer, 1965.
- Planetary Agent X, 1965. Fix-up of "Ultima Thule" and "Hatchetman." First book of the United Planets series.
- Of Godlike Power, 1966. Also published as Earth Unaware.
- Space Pioneer, 1966. Reprint of "Space Pioneer."
- Time Gladiator, 1966. Reprint of "Sweet Dreams, Sweet Princes." Third book of the Joe Mauser series.
- Computer War, 1967.
- The Rival Rigelians, 1967. Expansion of "Adaptation." Third book of the United Planets series.
- Planetary Agent X, 1967. Reprint.
- Dawnman Planet, 1967. Second book of the United Planets series.
- After Some Tomorrow, 1967.
- Mercenary From Tomorrow, 1968. First book of the Joe Mauser series. (Expansion of the 1962 short story "Mercenary" published in Analog)
- Code Duello, 1968. Fourth book of the United Planets series.
- Earth Unaware, 1968. Reprint.
- Mission to Horatius, 1968. First Star Trek: The Original Series tie-in novel.
- The Cosmic Eye, 1969. Expansion of "Speakeasy."
- The Space Barbarians, 1969.
- The Five Way Secret Agent, 1969.

==== 1970s ====
- Computer World, 1970.
- Once Departed, 1970.
- Blackman's Burden, 1972. First book of the North Africa series.
- Border, Breed nor Birth, 1972. Second book of the North Africa series.
- The Home of the Inquisitor (as Maxine Reynolds), 1972.
- The House in the Kasbah (as Maxine Reynolds), 1972.
- Looking Backward from the Year 2000, 1973. First book of the Julian West series.
- Computer War, 1973.
- Code Duello, 1973.
- Depression or Bust, 1974. Fix-up of "Depression. . .or Bust," "Expediter","Fad," and "The Expert."
- Dawnman Planet, 1974. Reprint.
- Commune 2000 A.D., 1974. First book of the Bat Hardin series.
- The Towers of Utopia, 1975. Second book of the Bat Hardin series.
- Satellite City, 1975.
- Amazon Planet, 1975. Fifth book of the United Planets series.
- The Cosmic Eye, 1975.
- Ability Quotient, 1975.
- Tomorrow Might Be Different, 1975. Expansion of "Russkies Go Home!"
- The Five Way Secret Agent, 1975. Reprint of "The Five Way Secret Agent."
- Mercenary from Tomorrow, 1975.
- Day After Tomorrow, 1976. Reprint of "Status Quo."
- Section G: United Planets, 1976. Sixth book of the United Planets series.
- Rolltown, 1976. Third book of the Bat Hardin series.
- Galactic Medal of Honor, 1976. Expansion of "Medal of Honor."
- After Utopia, 1977.
- Perchance to Dream, 1977.
- Space Visitor, 1977. Expansion of "Visitor."
- Police Patrol: 2000 A.D., 1977. Fix-up of "Romp," "Criminal in Utopia," "Cry Wolf!", and "Extortion, Inc."
- Equality in the Year 2000, 1977. Second book of the Julian West series.
- Trample an Empire Down, 1978.
- The Best Ye Breed, 1978. Third book of the North Africa series.
- Brain World, 1978. Seventh book of the United Planets series.
- The Fracas Factor, 1978. Fourth book of the Joe Mauser series.
- Earth Unaware, 1979.
- Lagrange Five, 1979. First book of the L-5 Community series.

==== 1980s ====
- The Lagrangists, 1983. Second book of the L-5 Community series.
- Chaos in Lagrangia, 1984. Third book of the L-5 Community series.
- Eternity (with Dean Ing), 1984.
- Home, Sweet Home 2010 A. D. (with Dean Ing), 1984.
- The Other Time (with Dean Ing), 1984.
- Space Search, 1984.
- Trojan Orbit (with Dean Ing), 1985.
- Deathwish World (with Dean Ing), 1986.
- Joe Mauser: Mercenary from Tomorrow (with Michael Banks), 1986. Rewrite and expansion of "Frigid Fracas" and Mercenary of Tomorrow.
- Sweet Dreams, Sweet Princes (with Michael Banks), 1986. Expansion of "Sweet Dreams, Sweet Princes" and Time Gladiator.

=== Fiction collections ===
- The Best of Mack Reynolds, 1976.
- Compounded Interests, 1983.
- Nine Tomorrows: Science Fiction Stories from the Golden Age, 2009.
- Mack Reynolds, Part One, 2011.

=== Anthologies edited ===
- Science Fiction Carnival (with Fredric Brown), 1953.

=== Nonfiction ===
- How to Retire without Money (as Bob Belmont), 1958.
- The Expatriates, 1963.
- "Mack Reynolds Replies" (with Poul Anderson, Ray Bradbury, and Isaac Asimov), The Magazine of Fantasy & Science Fiction, Oct. 1965.
- "What Do You Mean, Marxism?" Science Fiction Studies 1, Fall 1974.
- "Afterword," Foundation 16, May 1979.
- "Science Fiction and Political Economy, " SF Review 36, Aug. 1980.
- "SF and Socioeconomics," Fantastic Lives: Essays by Noted Science Fiction Writers, edited by Martin. H. Greenberg, 1981.
