= Necromancer (novel) =

1962 novel by Gordon R. Dickson

First edition, published by Doubleday Cover art by Wally Littman

Necromancer is a science fiction novel by American writer Gordon R. Dickson, published in 1962. It was alternatively titled No Room for Man between 1963 and 1974 before reverting to its original title. It is the prequel to Dickson's earlier novel Dorsai!.

== Plot ==
Necromancer follows the fortunes of Paul Formain, a mining engineer in the late 21st century who endures several accidents. His quest for self-discovery, and recovery from losing his arm, leads him to embrace the Chantry Guild. The Guild embraces a philosophy of destruction with the hope of making space for the rise of a new evolutionary form of humanity. The instruments in their goals are the Alternate Laws or Alternate Forces.

Formain is led to the Chantry Guild after encountering Destruct, a book written by Walter Blunt, the Guild's leader. Formain enlists under the mastery of Necromancer Jason Warren and the ethereal influence of musical vocalist Kantele Maki. His initial goal in joining the guild is the regeneration of his lost arm.

The story is punctuated by Formain's epiphany moments. First, he realizes the inadequacy of psychology in his self-exploration. He slowly realizes his own savant power over the Alternative Forces. He is taken aback by his growing hyper-awareness of the world around him, specifically the inter-related isolation of all individuals. This isolation is dramatically symbolized by Formain's own singularity. He has a final epiphany near the end of the book that clarifies for him his own identity and potential ... and much more.

The book is divided into three sub-books: Isolate, Set, and Pattern. In each book, Formain realizes the function of each mathematical collective in the flow of objective history and subjective reality. As with many science fiction novels, the philosophical underpinnings of evolution require a decidedly unscientific leap in the reader's understanding of what constitutes science to rally the punctuation that brings about the next stage of human evolution.

== Major characters ==
- Paul Formain
- Walter Blunt
- Jason Warren
- Kantele Maki

== Themes ==
The title Necromancer is applicable to the contents of the book in two ways. The general, popular conception, a worker of magic, superficially describes the workings of the Chantry Guild. The more technical definition, the occupation of telling the future by communicating with the dead, is applied in the identity and history of Paul Formain, once again, revealed in the climax of the book.

Evolutionary transition is only one of several themes of classic Science Fiction found in Necromancer. It is the link between this novel and the rest of Dickson's Childe Cycle. Also represented, though, are themes of time-travel, immortality and parapsychology.

== Place in Dickson's Childe Cycle ==
Though Dorsai! (as The Genetic General) was actually written first, Necromancer is chronologically the first story in Dickson's Childe Cycle of novels. Dickson's own chronology in the essay "See a Thousand Years" places the events at the last decade of the 21st century. However, Sandra Miesel identifies Paul Formain as another incarnation of characters found later in the Childe Cycle: Hal Mayne and Donal Graeme. So Formain's chronological place is somewhat fluid. His "life" extends the length of the cycle.
