= Dorsai! =

1960 novel by Gordon R. Dickson

- First edition
- Author: Gordon R. Dickson
- Cover artist: Ed Valigursky
- Language: English
- Series: Childe Cycle
- Genre: Military Science Fiction
- Publisher: Ace Books
- Publication date: 1960
- Publication place: United States
- Media type: Print (Paperback)
- Pages: 159
- Followed by: Necromancer

Dorsai! is the first published book of the incomplete Childe Cycle series of science fiction novels by American writer Gordon R. Dickson. Later books are set both before and after the events in Dorsai!.

The novel was originally published in serialized form in Astounding Science Fiction, starting in May 1959. A shorter, revised version was published in paperback by Ace in 1960 under the title The Genetic General. A re-edited and expanded version of the novel was published under its original serialized title, Dorsai!, by DAW in 1976. This version of the novel was reissued as one half of an omnibus edition, Dorsai Spirit by Tor in 2002. The other novel contained in Dorsai Spirit is The Spirit of Dorsai (originally published 1979).

== Plot ==
An odd boy. You never know which way he'll jump.

The book is about Donal Graeme, warrior extraordinaire. In the Childe Cycle universe, the human race has split into a number of splinter cultures. Donal is a member of the Dorsai, a splinter culture based on the planet of the same name, which has specialized in producing the very best soldiers. Since each splinter culture specializes in a specific area of expertise, a system of trade labour contracts between the cultures allows each planet to hire the expertise they need. The Dorsai, inhabiting a resource-poor world, hire themselves out as mercenaries to other planetary governments. Donal has great ambitions, and the book follows his rise in an episodic manner. The book begins as a straightforward tale of his career and then becomes something else, as it becomes clear there is something different about Donal Graeme himself.

Donal quickly comes to the attention of William of Ceta, a powerful politician. First he is asked by Anea Marlivana, a so-called Select of Kultis, to destroy her contract binding her to William. Instead Donal returns the contract to William and gains a post in his military. Donal next catches one of William's officers in a plan to fake some heroics, compromising Anea in the process. Taking command himself, Donal has the officer shot for violating the Mercenaries Code. Leaving William's command, he embarks on a series of operations in different conflicts that mark him as an innovative genius.

In the final chapters, Donal achieves something previously thought impossible: the invasion and conquest of a planet, William's home world. During William's capture, Donal finds that William tortured and killed Donal's brother. He turns one of his new-found abilities on William, inducing agony, then enters a coma himself. On waking much later, he frees William from the "curse", saying that William will be needed. There is a conference to address the fallout from Donal's actions, resulting in the formation of a Federation with him as leader. Anea is now Donal's consort, but Donal has changed into something beyond the normal human. He calls himself "an intuitive superman", gazing outward at the stars.

== Characters ==
- Donal Graeme, a soldier raised on the Dorsai, but descended from Exotics on his mother's side.
- Anea Marlivana, a woman who is the result of a selective breeding program by the Exotic worlds. She is known as a Select of Kultis, standing as a symbol of their cultural aspirations.
- William of Ceta, a powerful merchant prince in the interstellar community. Despite his power and wealth, William leads a frugal existence.
- ArDell Montor, William's expert in social dynamics and part of William's plan for hegemony. ArDell has psychological problems including addictions.
- Hugh Killienn, a Freilander and one of William's officers who is attempting to woo Anea, which William tries to use to advantage.
- Ian Ten Graeme, Donal's uncle and twin brother of Kensie Graeme.
- Hendrick Galt, First Marshal of Freiland, an influential Dorsai officer experienced in interstellar politics.
- Coruna El Man, a battle-hardened Dorsai officer who becomes one of Donal's most important tacticians alongside Ian Graeme.
- Eachan Khan Graeme, Donal's father.
- Sayona the Bond, an Exotic who acts as the spokesman for the worlds of Mara and Kultis, personifying the "bond" between the two worlds.

== Literary significance and criticism ==
Dorsai! is an influential part of the genre of military science fiction. In the foreword of later editions, the novel is said to have explored the role of a commander the way Starship Troopers explored the role of a trooper.

Much of the criticism regarding Dorsai! is of characteristics said to be typical for science fiction books of the era, including "wooden dialog and rampant misogyny".

== Awards and nominations ==
Dorsai! was nominated for a Hugo Award for best novel in 1960. It lost to another work of military science fiction, Starship Troopers by Robert A. Heinlein.

== Cultural references ==
In the popular 1990s computer game Star Control II, one of the melee captains for the (human) Earthling Cruiser is named "Graeme", alongside other recognizable human science fiction captain names including "Kirk", "Decker", "Adama", "Solo", and "Buck".

== Release details ==
- The Genetic General / Time to Teleport, (1960, Gordon R. Dickson, Ace Double, #D-449, $0.35, 159+96pp, paperback)
- The Genetic General, (1967, Gordon R. Dickson, Ace, #F-426, $0.40, 159pp, paperback)
- Three to Dorsai!, (1975, Gordon R. Dickson, Nelson Doubleday, hardcover, collection)
- Dorsai, (1976, Gordon R. Dickson, DAW, #UW1218, 236pp, paperback)
- The Genetic General, (1986, Gordon R. Dickson, Ace, ISBN 0-441-16023-9, $3.50, 305pp, paperback)
- Dorsai!, (1988, Gordon R. Dickson, Easton Press, $32.00, 162pp, hardcover)
- Dorsai!, (1989, Gordon R. Dickson, Sphere, ISBN 0-7221-2972-6, £2.50, 176pp, paperback)
- Dorsai!, (1993, Gordon R. Dickson, Tor, ISBN 0-8125-0398-8, $4.99, 280pp, paperback)
- Dorsai Spirit, (2002, Gordon R. Dickson, Tor, ISBN 0-312-87764-1, $25.95, 432pp, hardcover)
