= Charles A. Spano Jr. =

American novelist

- Born: 1948 (age 77–78); Scranton, Pennsylvania
- Writing career
- Genre: Science fiction
- Notable work: Spock, Messiah!

Charles A. Spano Jr. (born 1948), sometimes bylined without his middle initial, is an American writer who co-wrote one of the first original novels based on the universe of the Star Trek television series. Spock, Messiah!, co-authored by Theodore R. Cogswell and Spano Jr. It was first published by Bantam Books in 1976, and reissued in October 1984 (ISBN 0-553-24674-7) and by the Bantam imprint Spectra in September 1993 (ISBN 0-553-24674-7, cover by Kazuhiko Sano).

Born in Scranton, Pennsylvania and a teacher by profession, he is married to Mary Rose McAndrew, with whom he has four children. Among his other writings are the short-short story "Drawing Board", published in the anthology Microcosmic Tales (Taplinger, 1980, ISBN 0-88677-532-9) and edited by Isaac Asimov, Martin H. Greenberg & Joseph D. Olander; and the short story "Grain of Truth", published in the digest Analog Science Fiction and Science Fact (Dec. 1980) and reprinted in the book A Spadeful of Spacetime (Ace, 1981), edited by Fred Saberhagen. He has also been writing an alternate history novel centering on Alaska.
