= Mission to Horatius =

Book by Mack Reynolds

- First edition cover
- Author: Mack Reynolds
- Illustrator: Sparky Moore
- Language: English
- Genre: Science fiction
- Publisher: Whitman
- Publication date: 1968
- Publication place: United States
- Media type: Print (Hardcover)
- Pages: 210
- OCLC: 40742101

Mission to Horatius is a novel based on the American science fiction television series Star Trek: The Original Series. It was published in 1968 by Whitman, and was the first original novel based on the series. The first novel for adult audiences, Spock Must Die!, was not published until February 1970. Mission to Horatius details the adventures of the crew of the U.S.S. Enterprise investigating where a distress signal had originated, resulting in them engaging with several different human colonies.

The novel was written by Mack Reynolds, and was Whitman's only original fiction based on the series. The producers of Star Trek had issues with the book, as they were concerned that it was dull and poorly written, in addition to containing offensive descriptions of both Sulu and Uhura. Gene Roddenberry intervened, stating that he would rather call off the publishing deal than see the property harmed. It was corrected, but Roddenberry was still dissatisfied with the novel. As Whitman had gone out of business years earlier, Pocket Books was able to re-publish the book in celebration of holding the Star Trek license for 20 years.

== Plot synopsis ==
The U.S.S. Enterprise is headed to Starbase 12 for shore leave, supplies and repairs. Food is running low and the engines need servicing. A distress signal diverts the ship to a solar system on the outer edge of explored space. Upon hearing of the emergency mission, Dr. McCoy expresses his concern about the mental health of the crew to Kirk. In Dr. McCoy's opinion, the Enterprise has been on patrol for such a long time that the crew is in danger of developing a form of space madness known as cafard.

Upon reaching the NGC 400 solar system, the Enterprise crew comes across three planets populated by different human settlers who had been unhappy with the social or political order of Earth. One planet has reverted to a Stone Age state, another has a mid-20th century technology while the third maintains a level of technology capable of space travel and advanced weaponry.

Kirk and crew must determine who sent a distress signal and the nature of the emergency. Along the way, they encounter a warrior society, a planet where drugs are used to control the general population and a culture consisting of an elite class with clones handling the day-to-day chores required by society.

== Production ==
The first works of fiction based in the Star Trek universe were the Star Trek comic books, which began publication in 1967. These were followed the same year by short story adaptations of the episodes of Star Trek published by Bantam Books and written by James Blish. Mission to Horatius became the first original fiction published in novel form based on the Star Trek series when it was published in hardcover by Whitman in 1968, and the only novel to be published while Star Trek was still being broadcast. It was written by Mack Reynolds, and illustrated by Sparky Moore.

Issues with the novel were first raised with the producers of the television show by John Meredyth Lucas, who contacted both Desilu Business Affairs and Gene Roddenberry, warning them that the novel was "not technically in bad taste, but is extremely dull, and even considering the juvenile market, badly written". He added that it contained several inaccuracies including describing Vulcans as Vulcanians, and an issue with Spock quoting poetry. There were concerns that Sulu had been described as a "bland faced, small oriental" and Uhura was called a "negress" and sings a spiritual. Roddenberry wrote of his concern with the project on November 14, 1967, to Desilu Business Affairs, saying he agreed with Lucas' comments, and that Star Trek "is a valuable property worth protecting and I personally would rather blow a deal like this than see the property harmed." Despite corrections, Roddenberry wrote a five-page dissection of Mission to Horatius describing what he felt was wrong with the novel.

The first original Star Trek novel for adults, Spock Must Die!, was not published until February 1970. While Whitman did not publish any other Star Trek novels, it did publish coloring books based on the series. Mission to Horatius was reprinted as a facsimile edition by Pocket Books in February 1999 to ostensibly celebrate the publisher's 20th anniversary as a Star Trek licensee. Editor John J. Ordover stated, when interviewed for Jeff Ayers' Voyages of Imagination, that it was reprinted for fun, and when pitched, he had explained Paramount Studios held the rights to the book as Whitman had gone out of business. He added "It was selling for $50 at conventions. So why not do a reissue? It was the first Star Trek novel ever done and the first one I read." Pocket Books bought a second-hand copy from science fiction author Dayton Ward to complete the reproduction.

== Reviews ==
Most reviews are mediocre although criticism of plot developments or characterizations are usually muted by an acknowledgment of the book being aimed at younger readers.
