= Astounding: John W. Campbell Memorial Anthology =

1973 anthology

- Editor: Harry Harrison
- Cover artist: John Sposato
- Language: English
- Subjects: Science fiction, Fantasy
- Publisher: Random House
- Publication date: 1973
- Publication place: United States
- Media type: Print (Hardcover)
- Pages: 302
- ISBN: 9780283981586

Astounding: John W. Campbell Memorial Anthology is a 1973 anthology honoring American science fiction and fantasy editor John W. Campbell, in the form of an anthology of short stories by various science fiction authors, edited by Harry Harrison. It was first published in hardcover by Random House as a selection of the Science Fiction Book Club, and first published in paperback by Ballantine Books.

The stories were contributed by writers who had been previously published in the pages of Analog, the publication that Campbell had edited for many years. The book includes a foreword by Isaac Asimov and an afterword by Harry Harrison, and each story is prefaced by comments either by the author or the editor. It won the 1974 Locus Award for Best Anthology.

== Contents ==
- "The Father of Science Fiction" (introduction by Isaac Asimov)
- "Lodestar" (Poul Anderson)
- "Thiotimoline to the Stars" (Isaac Asimov)
- "Something Up There Likes Me" (Alfred Bester)
- "Lecture Demonstration" (Hal Clement)
- "Early Bird" (Theodore Cogswell and Theodore L. Thomas)
- "The Emperor's Fan" (L. Sprague de Camp)
- "Brothers" (Gordon R. Dickson)
- "The Mothballed Spaceship" (Harry Harrison)
- "Black Sheep Astray" (Mack Reynolds)
- "Epilog" (Clifford D. Simak)
- "The External Triangle" (George O. Smith)
- "Helix the Cat" (Theodore Sturgeon)
- "Probability Zero! The Population Implosion" (Theodore R. Cogswell)
- "Afterword" (Harry Harrison)
