= Soldier, Ask Not =

1967 novel by Gordon R. Dickson

- Cover of the first edition
- Author: Gordon R. Dickson
- Cover artist: Paul Lehr
- Language: English
- Series: Dorsai Trilogy
- Genre: Science fiction
- Publisher: Dell Books[Sphere UK]
- Publication date: 1967
- Publication place: United States
- Media type: Print (paperback)
- Pages: 222
- Award: Hugo Award for Best Short Fiction (1965)
- ISBN: 978-0-8125-0400-2
- OCLC: 27868874
- Preceded by: Tactics of Mistake
- Followed by: Dorsai!

Soldier, Ask Not is a science fiction novel by American writer Gordon R. Dickson, published in 1967 by Dell Publishing company. It is also the title of a novella which appeared in the October 1964 issue of Galaxy Science Fiction magazine. The shorter work constitutes about one third of the novel and won the 1965 Hugo Award for Best Short Fiction.

It is part of Dickson's Childe Cycle series, in which mankind has reached the stars and divided into specialized splinter groups. It takes place roughly the same time as Dorsai!, and a few characters appear in both books. Themes from the rest of the cycle are echoed here, particularly the actions of key people, like Paul Formain, Cletus Grahame and Donal Graeme in the other novels, who can drastically affect history due to his ability to analyze and influence the behavior of others. Unlike the other protagonists, however, Tam Olyn is no hero.

== Setting ==
In the late 23rd century, humanity settled fifteen younger worlds around nine stars, including Earth's solar system. Although Old Earth remains populated by the traditional variety of "full-spectrum" people, the younger worlds have developed "splinter" cultures, taking very divergent paths and developing specialized cultures. Most notable of these are: the Exotics, philosophers, mystics and psychologists; the Friendlies, puritan faith-holders who supplement the meager production of their rocky worlds by hiring out as mercenaries; and the Dorsai, true professional soldiers, highly skilled and expertly trained. Other worlds have specialized in different ways, in the sciences, mining, agriculture or commerce.

The primary medium of interplanetary trade is in personal service contracts. The worlds are divided into the "loose" worlds, where individuals maintain some control over their contracts, and the "tight" worlds, where personal contracts may be bought and sold regardless of the wishes of the individual worker.

The title refers to a hymn sung by soldiers of the Friendly worlds. The first lines are "Soldier, ask not, now or ever, where to war your banners go".

== Plot summary ==
Tam Olyn is an ambitious, vain, angry young man. Orphaned at a young age, and raised by a nihilist uncle, he cares little for others, with the possible exception of his younger sister, Eileen. Following his graduation from school, he is ready to launch his career as a journalist among the stars.

In a prelude to the main events of the novel, he and Eileen visit the Final Encyclopedia, a centuries-long project to try to collect and catalog all knowledge. While standing at the center of the index room, Tam is identified as a one-in-a-billion person who can actually hear the voices of humanity while there. The dying director of the Encyclopedia wants him to stay on and succeed him, but an Exotic, Padma from the planet Mara, reads him as having no identity with others, no empathy, no soul. He cannot help the Encyclopedia.

His sister has become engaged to Jamethon Black, a young mercenary from the Friendly world of Harmony. Despite the fact that Black seems a very decent young man, Tam callously manipulates his sister into breaking the engagement.

Shortly, he leaves Earth, beginning his profession as a newsman. In the following five years, he advances in his profession, while his sister emigrates to Cassida, and marries a young engineer there.

While covering a war on New Earth, he finds his sister's husband, who has been drafted, and attempts to keep him out of harm's way by using him as an assistant. The plan backfires. His brother-in-law, along with several other prisoners, is slaughtered by a fanatic Friendly soldier, in violation of the laws of war. Despite the fanatic's execution for his war crime, Tam chooses to blame the entire Friendly culture, and sets out to destroy them.

Unfortunately, Tam has the ability to analyze people and situations, and manipulate them expertly. Padma observes his actions, and tries to put a brake on his behavior, but he will not be stopped. By manipulating events, he creates a situation for the Friendlies that may result in their destruction as a viable culture.

In the culmination of events, he arrives to cover a war on the planet of St. Marie, a small agrarian world in the same system as Mara and Kultis, the Exotic planets. (At this point, the novella's narrative commences.) On one side are the mercenary forces hired by the Exotics, led by the identical Dorsai twin brothers, Ian and Kensie Graeme. The twins, who appear in a number of other stories, are opposites in every way. Kensie is warm, friendly, loved by all, and a great leader of men. Ian is cold as ice, analytical, and a great tactician. He is respected and feared.

On the other side are a group of Friendlies who had been misled into supporting an abortive local revolution. The Friendlies are led by Jamethon Black, whose engagement Tam had broken years earlier. The Friendlies are hopelessly outgunned and outnumbered. Tam has manipulated the situation so that not only will the Friendlies lose, but their ability to hire out their soldiers will be crippled, possibly leading to the end of their viability as a culture. He believes he can link the Friendlies to assassins hired locally, against all the accepted rules of war. He tries to recruit Kensie Graeme in a scheme to expose this, but Kensie refuses and insists on prosecuting the campaign his own way.

Padma is also on St. Marie. He continues to try to dissuade Tam from his quest. He explains that people from the Splinter cultures are not insane fanatics as Tam sees them, but rather a new kind of human where all the components of the human spirit are unified in a single direction. He gives Tam a copy of a secret communication between Jamethon's superiors that appears to abandon hope of them winning, and leave them to be destroyed, and further to conceal this from the troops. Tam shows this to Jamethon, who interprets it a completely different way based on his faith.

The result is a shootout between Kensie Graeme, Jamethon and a few of his lieutenants at a parley meeting in a field, with Tam as a witness. Kensie kills all the attackers despite being outnumbered and surprised, since he was expecting to discuss surrender. This leaves the Friendly forces leaderless, giving them no option but to lay down their arms.

In the end, he is thwarted only by the faith of Black, and the honor and courage of the Graeme brothers, despite the incredible cost to them. The best qualities of the splinter cultures defeat the worst qualities of Tam Olyn. Padma tells Tam that his attempt to sway Jamethon actually solved his dilemma. By rejecting what he saw as the Devil's Choice of surrendering to save his own life, Jamethon saw a way to end the conflict by sacrificing himself in a futile attempt to assassinate a vastly superior Dorsai officer. Padma gave Tam the secret document knowing that this would be the outcome.

As Padma explains to him, had Tam succeeded, not only would a necessary component of the human spirit have been lost, but the entire balance of power among the worlds would have been horribly upset. Eventually, Padma manages to break through his shell, allowing Tam to grow into more of a human being, and take his place at the Final Encyclopedia. Tam, for his part, realizes that his lust for revenge was partly to cover his shame over his fear and cowardice on New Earth.

A key event in the aftermath, barely mentioned in this book, is the assassination of Kensie Graeme by agents of the original rebellion, and the manner in which his brother's honor prevents the bloodbath which could have resulted at the hands of Kensie's angry troops. These events occur after Tam has left the planet. The story is told in great detail in the short story "Brothers". Padma tells Tam that his intervention has resulted in Ian Graeme transforming into an individual of unknown potential for the future. In the third novel of the trilogy, Dorsai!, Ian is instrumental in leading the invasion and conquest of William of Ceta's home planet.

== Characters ==
- Tam Olyn, a journalist from Earth
- Jamethon Black, a Friendly soldier from Harmony
- Padma, an Exotic from Mara. He is the "OutBond" or ambassador from the current Bond of the Exotics, a person who personifies the bond between the worlds of Mara and Kultis.
- Kensie Graeme, a mercenary soldier, field commander of the Dorsai forces
- Ian Graeme, a mercenary soldier, base commander and tactician of the Dorsai forces

== Bibliography ==
- Clute, John; Peter Nicholls (1995). The Encyclopedia of Science Fiction. New York: St. Martin's Griffin. p. 332. ISBN 0-312-13486-X.
- Miller, P. Schuyler (April 1968). "The Reference Library: Ex TV". Analog Science Fiction and Fact. LXXXI (2). Condé Nast Publications, Inc.: 163.
- Robinson, Spider (July 1976). "Bookshelf". Galaxy Magazine. 37 (5): 123.
- Tuck, Donald H. (1974). The Encyclopedia of Science Fiction and Fantasy. Chicago: Advent. p. 143. ISBN 0-911682-20-1.
