= Theodore Cogswell =

American writer

Theodore Rose Cogswell
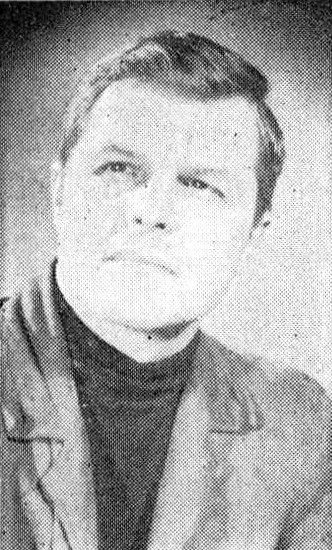
- Theodore R. "Ted" Cogswell, c. 1955
- Born: March 10, 1918; Coatesville, Pennsylvania, US
- Died: February 3, 1987 (aged 68); Scranton, Pennsylvania, US
- Military career
- Allegiance: Spanish Republic
- Branch: International Brigades
- Units: The "Abraham Lincoln" XV International Brigade
- Conflicts: Spanish Civil War

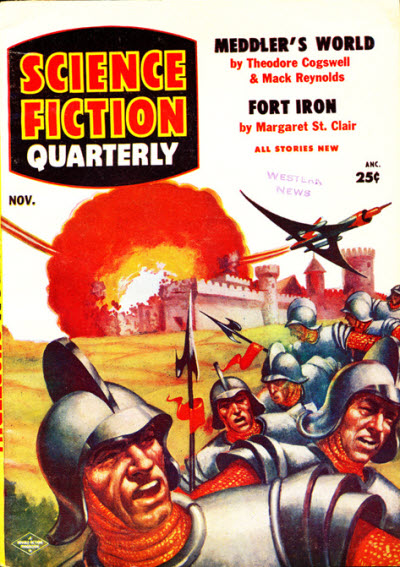
"Meddler's World", a novelette by Cogswell and Mack Reynolds, was the cover story on the November 1956 issue of Science Fiction Quarterly.

Theodore Rose Cogswell (March 10, 1918 – February 3, 1987) was an American science fiction author.

== Profile ==
During the Spanish Civil War, Cogswell served as an ambulance driver for the Republicans as part of the Abraham Lincoln Brigade. He later served in the U.S. Army Air Corp during WWII, where he flew cargo planes over the Burma Road hump, and was discharged with the rank of Captain.

His earliest work to be published in a genre magazine, the novella, "The Spectre General" in Astounding (June 1952), was a humorous story concerning the long-forgotten maintenance brigade of the Imperial Space Marines of a Galactic empire. It was selected as one of the genre's best novellas by members of the Science Fiction Writers of America and reprinted in The Science Fiction Hall of Fame.

Cogswell authored nearly 40 science fiction stories, most of them humorous, and co-authored Spock, Messiah!, one of the earliest novels tied in to the Star Trek franchise. He was also the editor of the long-running "fanzine for pros", Proceedings of the Institute for Twenty-First Century Studies. An anthology of selections from PITCS was published by NESFA Press in 1993. Here, writers and editors discussed their own, and other's, works.

== Bibliography ==
=== Novels ===
- Spock, Messiah! (1976) (Star Trek tie-in novel co-authored Charles A. Spano, Jr.)

=== Collections ===
- The Wall Around the World (1962) (including the title story)
- The Third Eye (1968)

=== Other works ===
- "The Friggin Falcon" (1966) (poem)
- PITCS: Proceedings of the Institute for Twenty-First Century Studies (1993, editor)
