= Bonfire of the vanities =

Religiously motivated burning of objects believed to lead to sin

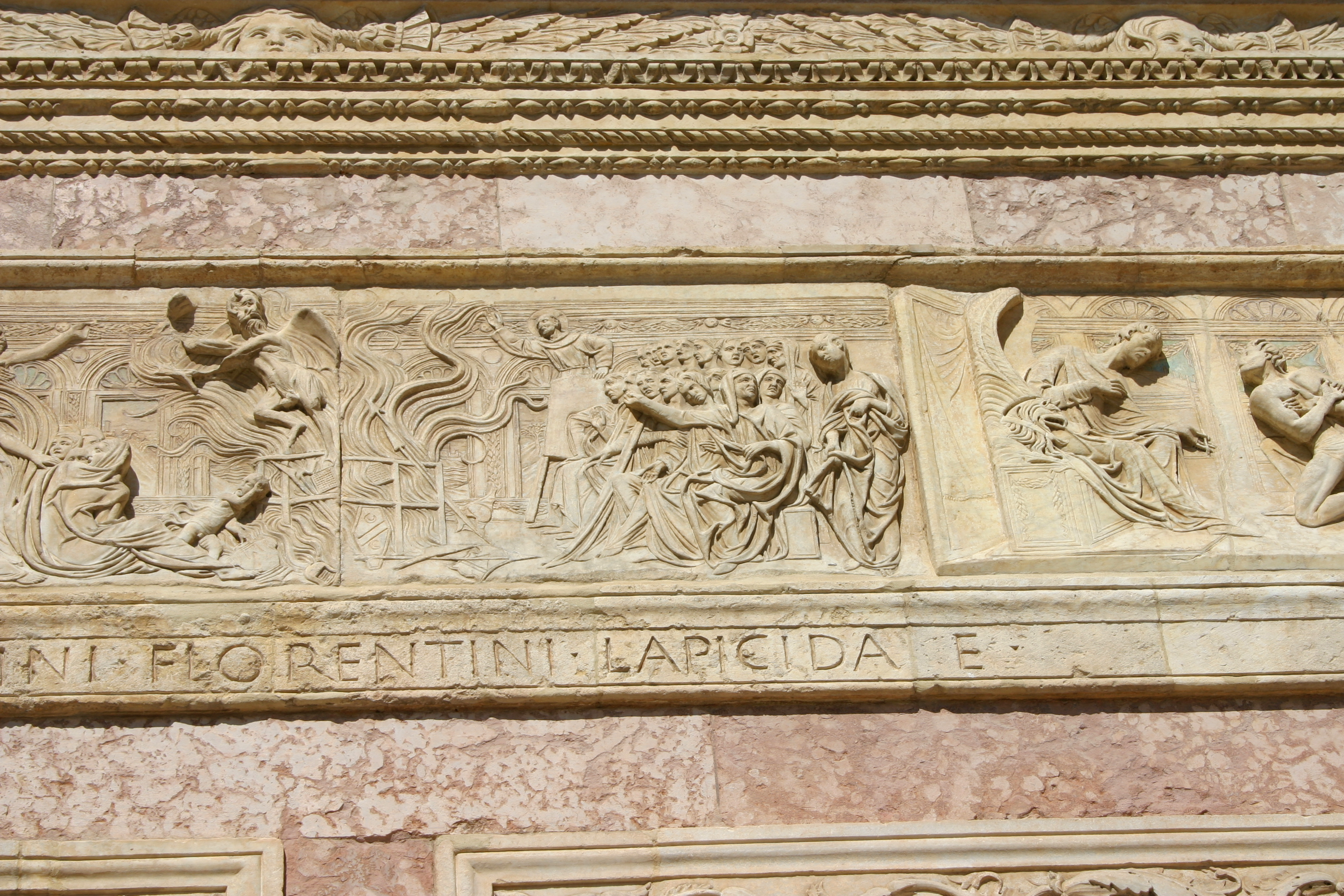
- Bernardino of Siena organising a vanities bonfire, Perugia, from the Oratory of San Bernardino, by Agostino di Duccio, built between 1457 and 1461
- Native name: Falò delle vanità
- Date: 7 February 1497
- Location: Florence, Italy
- Type: Burning of objects condemned by authorities as occasions of sin
- Theme: Supporters of Dominican priest Girolamo Savonarola collected and publicly burned thousands of objects, such as cosmetics, art, and books

A bonfire of the vanities (Italian: falò delle vanità) is a burning of objects condemned by religious authorities as occasions of sin. The phrase itself usually refers to the bonfire of 7 February 1497, when supporters of the Dominican friar Girolamo Savonarola collected and burned thousands of objects such as cosmetics, art, and books in the public square of Florence, Italy, on the occasion of Shrove Tuesday, martedì grasso.

Francesco Guicciardini's The History of Florence gives a firsthand account of the 1497 Florentine bonfire of the vanities. The focus was on objects that might tempt one to sin, including vanity items such as mirrors, cosmetics, fine dresses, playing cards, and musical instruments. Other targets included books that Savonarola deemed immoral, such as works by Boccaccio, manuscripts of secular songs, and artworks, including paintings and sculptures.

== Precursors ==
Although often associated with Savonarola, such bonfires had been a common accompaniment to the outdoor sermons of San Bernardino di Siena in the first half of the 15th century.

== Savonarola ==
Savonarola was a Dominican friar who was assigned to work in Florence in 1490 at the request of Lorenzo de' Medici. Within a few years, Savonarola became one of the foremost enemies of the House of Medici and helped bring about their downfall in 1494. Savonarola campaigned against what he considered to be the artistic and social excesses of Renaissance Italy, preaching with great vigor against any luxury. His power and influence grew so much that, with time, he became the effective ruler of Florence and had soldiers for his protection following him around.

During Carnival in 1497 and 1498, Savonarola began to host a regular "bonfire of the vanities". He collected and burned objects that he considered objectionable, including nude paintings, wigs and makeup, love poetry, games and dice, and music and musical instruments. Anyone who tried to object found their hands being forced by teams of Savonarola supporters. These supporters called themselves Piagnoni ("Weepers") after a public nickname that was initially intended as an insult.

Savonarola's influence did not go unnoticed by the higher church officials, and his actions came to the attention of Pope Alexander VI. He was excommunicated on 13 May 1497. He was charged with heresy and sedition at the command of Pope Alexander VI. Savonarola was executed by hanging on 23 May 1498, and his body was burned. His death occurred in the Piazza della Signoria, where he had previously held his bonfires of the vanities. Then the papal authorities gave word that anyone in possession of the friar's writings had four days to turn them over to a papal agent for destruction. Anyone who did not comply also faced excommunication.

=== Botticelli ===
Although some later sources reported that the Florentine artist Sandro Botticelli burned several of his classical mythology paintings in the great Florentine bonfire of 1497, a biography from Vasari does not mention this. Furthermore, no early records of Vasari indicate that Botticelli ceased creating future works after coming under the influence of Savonarola. Modern art historians also indicate several of his paintings are assigned dates after Savonarola's death in 1498. The art historian Rab Hatfield says that one of Botticelli's paintings, The Mystical Nativity, cryptically dated 1500, is based on the sermon Savonarola delivered on Christmas Eve, 1493. Writing several centuries later in 1851, Orestes Brownson, an apologist for Savonarola, vaguely mentions artworks by Fra Bartolomeo, Lorenzo di Credi, and "many other painters", along with "several antique statues" being burnt in the bonfire.

== In popular culture ==
The event has been represented or mentioned in varying degrees of detail in several works of historical fiction, including George Eliot's Romola (1863), E. R. Eddison's A Fish Dinner in Memison (1941), Irving Stone's The Agony and the Ecstasy (1961), Chelsea Quinn Yarbro's The Palace (1978), Michael Ondaatje's The English Patient (1992), Roger Zelazny and Robert Sheckley's If at Faust You Don't Succeed (1993), Timothy Findley's Pilgrim (1999), Ian Caldwell and Dustin Thomason's Rule of Four (2004), Jeanne Kalogridis's I, Mona Lisa (2006), Traci L. Slatton's The Botticelli Affair (2013), and Jodi Taylor's No Time Like the Past (2015), and in television dramas including the Showtime series The Borgias, The Sky (Italy) and the Netflix (North America) series Borgia, and the third season (2019) of the Netflix (North America) series Medici in the final episode titled "The Fate of the City". Other references in popular culture include:

- As a metaphor, Tom Wolfe used the event and ritual as the title for his 1987 novel The Bonfire of the Vanities and its film adaptation.
- Vampires Marius and Armand visit the scene of Savonarola's execution after his body has been cleared away in Anne Rice's The Vampire Armand (1998)
- The bonfire is depicted in the video game Assassin's Creed II, in which Savonarola is one of the antagonists.
- Jordan Tannahill's 2016 play Botticelli in the Fire is a fictional retelling of the events leading up to the bonfire of the vanities.

== See also ==
- The Birth of Venus (novel)
- Bonfire Night
- Book burning
- Outward holiness
