= Mako Mori test =

Measure of representation of women in film

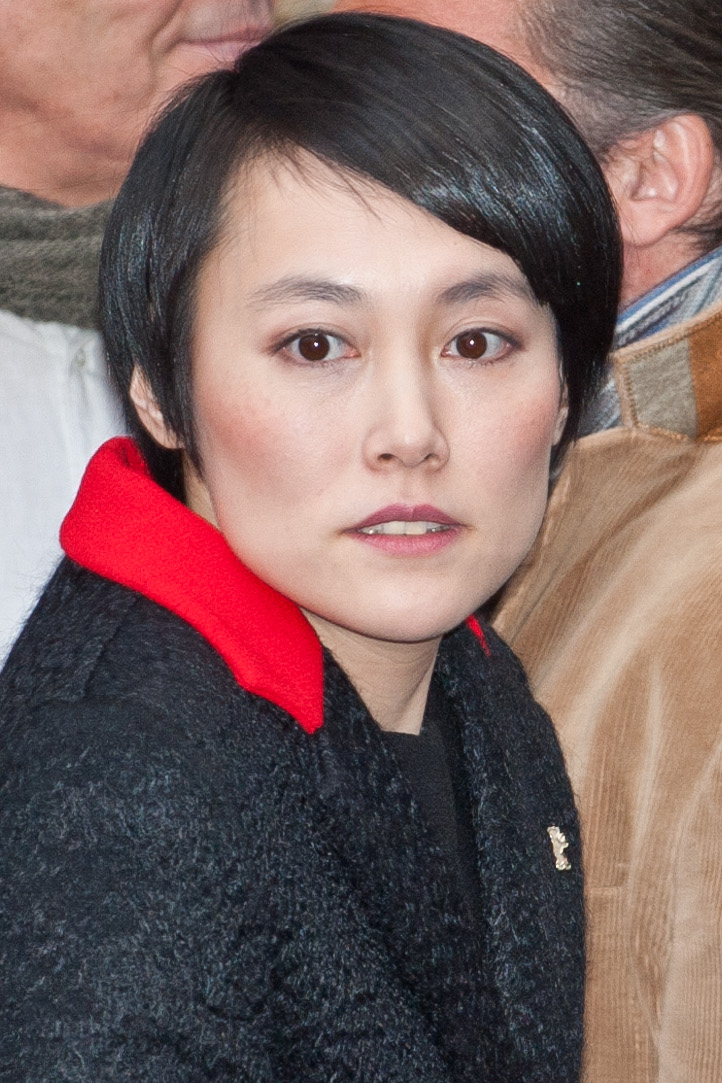
The character of Mako Mori was first portrayed by Rinko Kikuchi (pictured)

The Mako Mori test is a set of criteria pertaining to the representation of female characters within a film, television show or other work of fiction, inspired by the character Mako Mori from the 2013 film Pacific Rim.

The requirements of the Mako Mori test are that a film or television show has at least one female character, that this character has an independent plot arc, and that the character or her arc does not simply exist to support a male character's plot arc.

== Origins ==
Gender portrayal in media and fiction, especially within the film industry, has been discussed and problematized since the early days of the feminist movement. The Bechdel test seeks to measure the gender representation within film and other fiction. The requirements of the Bechdel test are that:

- A film must have at least two female characters (in some cases it is stipulated that these characters must be named and credited),
- That these characters have an on-screen conversation with each other,
- Where they talk about something other than a man or a heterosexual relationship that they are in.

The Pacific Rim movies do not pass the Bechdel test, although they feature a strong female supporting character, and so the Mako Mori test was proposed by a Tumblr user named Chaila as an alternative test of gender representation.

== Mako Mori (character) ==
The character of Mako Mori is featured across the Pacific Rim franchise, appearing in the films Pacific Rim and Pacific Rim: Uprising, the graphic novel Pacific Rim: Tales From Year Zero, as well as the non-canon work Pacific Rim: The Official Novelisation, which is a novelisation of the movie. Mako Mori is a female, Japanese character, portrayed (as an adult) by Japanese actress Rinko Kikuchi. Her character is described as being 'tomboyish' as a child, showing significant interest in her father's work as a sword maker. Her character is a part of the Pan Pacific Defense Corps' J-Tech division, a military organisation within the film.

Her character is celebrated by fans of the franchise and in academic circles as a successful representation of a strong and non-sexualised character who is both female and a person of colour. Megan Fowler highlighted the subtleties of her character, and says she widens the spectrum for a greater and more realistic depiction of strong females in film. According to Cait Coker, in an essay called "The Mako Mori Fan Club", she is heralded as a successful female character who does not conform to the common genre traits of over-sexualisation, and the common fetishisation of Japanese characters in Western media. Mako Mori is credited as an example of good female representation. Though she is a supporting character, she is given an independent story arc that does not simply exist to support the male lead characters' arc(s), and her character avoids many of the sexist stereotypes that often accompany women in film (especially in this genre) of over-sexualisation and lack of agency.

In the sequel Pacific Rim: Uprising, Mako Mori is given less of a substantial story arc, which critics say is simply in support of another male character's plot arc and therefore does not pass the test, and dies within the opening third of the movie. This shift in the franchise has been greatly criticised by fans of the movies as well as fans of the test itself.

== See also ==
- Johanson analysis
- Manic Pixie Dream Girl
- Mary Sue
