= Demons (Dillard novel) =

1986 novel by J.M. Dillard

- Author: J.M. Dillard
- Language: English
- Series: Star Trek: The Original Series
- Genre: Science fiction novel
- Publisher: Pocket Books
- Publication date: July 1986
- Publication place: United States
- Media type: Print (paperback)
- Pages: 256 pp
- ISBN: 1-85286-351-X (first edition, paperback)
- OCLC: 24719711
- Preceded by: Dreadnought!
- Followed by: Battlestations!

Demons is a Star Trek: The Original Series novel written by J.M. Dillard.

== Plot ==
A strange device found by a scientific expedition is taken to the planet Vulcan. It begins taking people over one by one, replacing them with malevolent power-hungry entities. The crew of the Enterprise, those not yet replaced, must contain this threat to Vulcan and defeat it.

== Background ==
This story is continued in the Star Trek: The Next Generation novel Possession, also by J.M. Dillard, where it is revealed the device is one of many.

== Reception ==
The book made the New York Times bestseller list in July 1986.

Robert Greenberger praised the novel for "some nice bits about Vulcan ritual and mind-control".

The character Anitra Lantry was described as a "Mary Sue" by Camille Bacon-Smith.
