= Timeline of fictional stories about the Mona Lisa =

Here below is a chronology of fictional and semi-fictional stories (including films, episodes in TV series, as well as literary works) that revolve, either wholly or partially, around the famous Mona Lisa, a portrait of Lisa del Giocondo painted by Leonardo da Vinci during the Renaissance in Florence. The years listed on the left refer to the year of release of these works of fiction.

== 1950s ==
- Ray Bradbury's 1952 short story, "The Smile", was published in 1959 in his collection A Medicine for Melancholy.

== 1960s ==
- 1965 - In the first-season episode "The Buccaneer" of the television series Voyage to the Bottom of the Sea, a band of modern-day buccaneers, led by the mysterious Mr. Logan (Barry Atwater), attempt to use the nuclear submarine Seaview to steal the Mona Lisa from the French warship Lorraine transporting the prized painting to the 1975 Australian World's Fair. The episode was first broadcast by ABC on February 8, 1965. (Note: The episode was the 22nd filmed and broadcast, but was not given a repeat broadcast for the first season of the Voyage to the Bottom of the Sea TV series. The episode was filmed over 9 1/2 days between December 31, 1964 and January 13, 1965 by Laslo Benedek based on a teleplay by staff writers William Welch and Al Gail. The Mona Lisa had been on loan to the United States between December 1962 to March 1963, and the painting had been transported by the ocean liner SS France, forming the likely background for the teleplay.)

== 1970s ==
- 1974 - Mona Lisa, The Woman in the Portrait, a novel by Sara Mayfield about Lisa Gherardini, the ruling houses of Renaissance Italy, and their intersections with Leonardo da Vinci.
- 1975 - The Second Mrs. Giaconda, a novel by E. L. Konigsburg exploring how the portrait came to be painted.
- 1975 - The Private Life of Mona Lisa, a novel by Pierre La Mure about the lives of Lisa Gherardini and Leonardo da Vinci that converge in the painting of the portrait.
- 1979 - The episode "City of Death", from the long running TV series Doctor Who, centres around a scheme of stealing the Mona Lisa from the Louvre. The Mona Lisa featured again several times in subsequent Doctor Who stories that were released from year 2001 onwards.

== 1980s ==
- 1985 - The adaptation of Sir Arthur Conan Doyle's The Final Problem in the television series Sherlock Holmes by Granada Television, also centres around a scheme involving the theft of the Mona Lisa from the Louvre. The scheme, however, is the creation of the screenwriters who dramatised the episode for TV, and is not in fact part of the original Conan Doyle story written in 1893.

== 2000s ==
- 2003 - The Da Vinci Code, a novel by Dan Brown. The Mona Lisa is an integral part of the plot, and this is underlined by the fact that the Mona Lisa itself has been used to grace the cover of this best-selling novel.
- 2006 - I, Mona Lisa, a historical novel by Jeanne Kalogridis about Lisa del Giocondo
- 2008 - The Smile, a historical novel by Donna Jo Napoli about Lisa del Giocondo
- 2009 - Mona Lisa's Revenge, a two-part episode of The Sarah Jane Adventures (a spin-off of Doctor Who). A science-fiction story in which Mona Lisa (portrayed by Suranne Jones) is revealed to be an alien criminal who was trapped within the painting for centuries.
