= Johanson analysis =

Method to evaluate representation of women in fiction

Johanson analysis, developed by film critic MaryAnn Johanson, provides a method to evaluate the representation of women and girls in fiction. The analysis evaluates media on criteria that include the basic representation of women, female agency, power and authority, the male gaze, and issues of gender and sexuality. Johanson's 2015 study, funded by a Kickstarter campaign, compiled statistics for every film released in 2015 and all those nominated for Oscars in 2014 or 2015. She also drew conclusions about movie profitability when women are represented well.

== Evaluation methodology ==
The Johanson analysis provides a method for evaluating the portrayal of women and girls in movies. Although developed for the screen, it can also be applied to books and other media. It consists of adding or subtracting points based on different categories of representation. The analysis offers a more wide-ranging and in-depth analysis than provided by methods that rely on the evaluation of only one or two aspects of female representation, such as the Bechdel test or Mako Mori test.

The analysis was developed by MaryAnn Johanson, also known as the FlickFilosopher, a film critic for a wide range of sources, both online and in print. An influential feminist voice in the film industry, Johanson was one of the film critics interviewed for the article at Rogerebert.com, "The Status of Feminist Film Criticism - A Roundup Report," which reviews the state of feminist film criticism in 2019. Her FlickFilosopher website has become known as a leading review site in feminist literary criticism. In operation continuously since 1997, it is one of the longest-running film review sites on the web.

Johanson rated every movie released wide in North America for 2015, as well as every movie nominated for the Oscars in 2014 and 2015, producing a detailed analysis of the releases for their representation of girls and women. She also compiled a list of the year's new releases ranked by the score they achieved in the analysis. The project received funding through a kickstarter campaign.

The following summarizes the areas considered in the analysis. Each category also considers whether or not the character is a person of color and if a male protagonist could be cast as a woman without having any significant impact on the film. A complete description of the categories and the rationale behind them can be found in the Johanson rating criteria.

=== Basic representation ===
The tests in this section measure female representation according to whether or not a central female character, either a girl or a woman, learns about herself, acts with self-determination, and achieves growth as a result of her experiences in the story. Does the story center on a woman? Is it her journey, her growth? Are the other characters mostly about supporting her story, instead of how she can support the stories of the male characters? The tests also consider whether or not a secondary female character grows, changes, or learns as part of the story, whether or not the woman is solely there to support the journey of the male characters, whether or not the woman is one of several standard stereotypes, and whether it is necessary for a film to exclude women from certain types of movies or roles.

=== Female agency, power, and authority ===
The tests in this section consider if a woman in the narrative controls her own life. Does a female character appear whose choices and actions influence those of other characters? Or is she merely a pawn of the plot? The analysis considers whether or not a female character holds a position of authority, including the complete range of jobs available to humans, in particular those considered traditionally male. It also asks if the role portrays female authority in a positive light, or does it bolster the idea that power and leadership are inappropriate or unfeminine for a woman, or damaging to her life.

=== The male gaze ===
The tests in this section consider if women are treated more like sexualized objects than people. Is the focus more on a woman's physical appearance than on her personality and inner qualities? For example, does a female character dress in a manner less appropriate to the situation than her male counterparts, such as wearing a skimpy top and shorts when the men wear jackets, long-sleeved shirts, and boots? It also considers whether the movie presents female characters as nude or partially nude in a manner out of proportion with the way men are presented, whether women are shot with gratuitous emphasis on their sexual characteristics, and the degree to which portrayals of women are sexualized compared to their male counterparts.

=== Gender and sexuality ===
This section considers whether or not a woman is defined by more than her gender or her relationships with men and children. These tests also look at the use of tropes that cast womanhood as a joke or in a demeaning manner. For example, a man who dresses as a woman is considered humorous, while a woman who dresses as a man is considered cool or nothing of particular note. The analysis also considers how women's relationships with men and children are portrayed, the tropes of dead or otherwise absent mothers and wives, and whether or not a man controls or tries to control a woman's sexual life.

== Statistics ==
Johanson compiled statistics for the year 2015 on how having a female protagonist affected a movie, and formed the following conclusions:

• only 22% of 2015's movies had female protagonists

• critics are slightly more likely to rate a film highly if it represents women well

• mainstream moviegoers are not turned off by films with female protagonists

• movies that represent women well are just as likely to be profitable as movies that don't, and are less risky as business propositions

— MaryAnn Johanson

== See also ==
- Bechdel test
- Feminism
- Feminist literary criticism
- Finkbeiner test
- Gender representation in video games
- Mako Mori test
- Manic Pixie Dream Girl
- Media and gender
- Smurfette principle
- Tokenism
