= Bechdel test =

Measure of women's representation in fiction

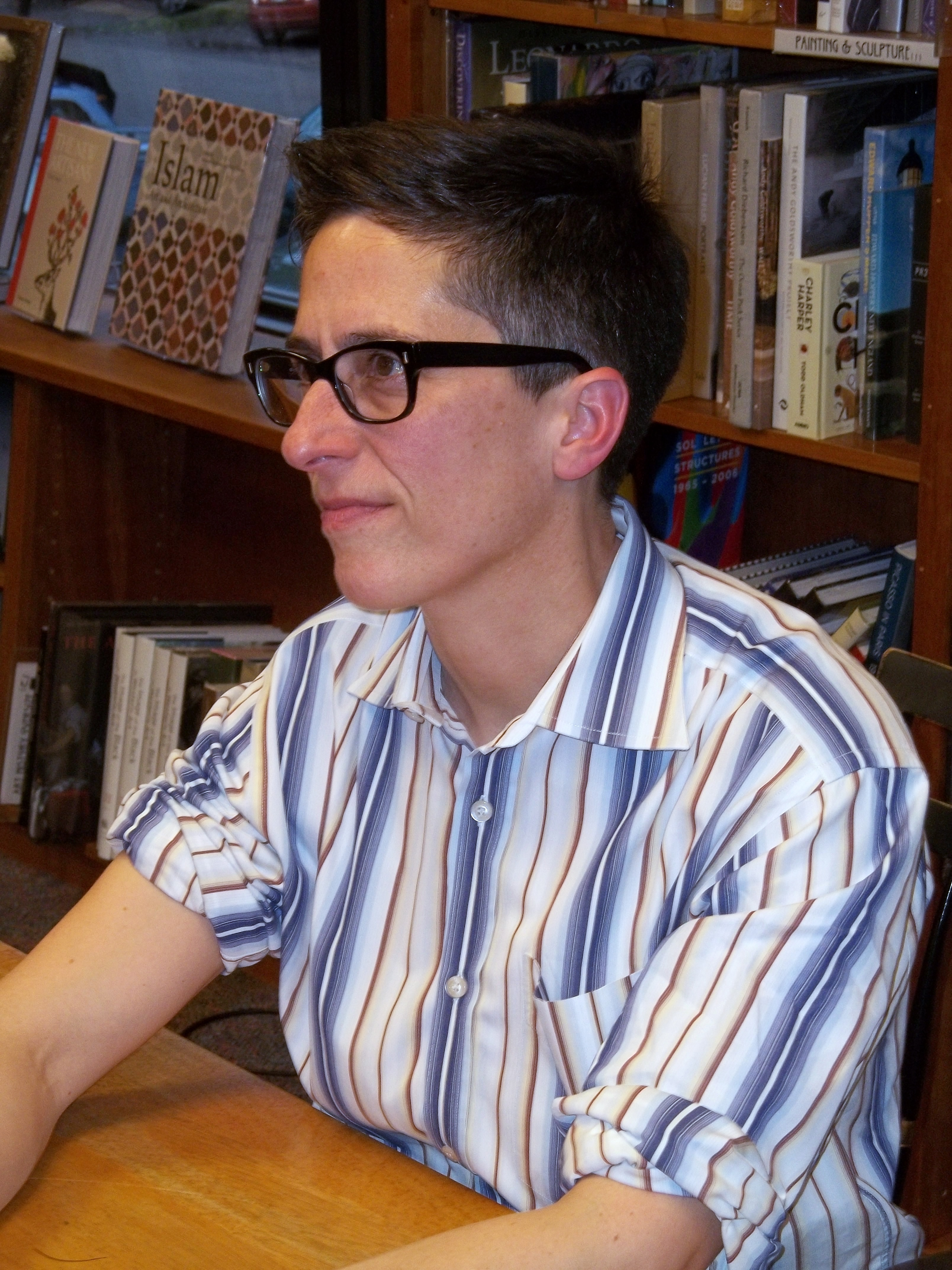
The American cartoonist Alison Bechdel incorporated her friend's "test" into a strip in Dykes to Watch Out For.

The Bechdel test (/ˈbɛkdəl/ BEK-dəl), also known as the Bechdel–Wallace test, is a measure of the representation of women in film and other fiction. The test asks whether a work features at least two women who have a conversation about something other than a man. Some versions of the test also require that those two women have names.

A work of fiction passing or failing the test does not necessarily indicate the overall representation of women in the work. Instead, the test is used as an indicator of the active presence (or lack thereof) of women in fiction, and to call attention to gender inequality in fiction.

The test is named after the American cartoonist Alison Bechdel, in whose 1985 comic strip Dykes to Watch Out For the test first appeared. Bechdel credited the idea to her friend Liz Wallace and the writings of Virginia Woolf. Originally meant as "a little lesbian joke in an alternative feminist newspaper", according to Bechdel, the test became more widely discussed in the 2000s, as a number of variants and tests inspired by it emerged.

== History ==
=== Gender portrayal in popular fiction ===
In her 1929 essay A Room of One's Own, Virginia Woolf wrote about the one-dimensional portrayal of women in contemporary fiction:

All these relationships between women, I thought, rapidly recalling the splendid gallery of fictitious women, are too simple. ... And I tried to remember any case in the course of my reading where two women are represented as friends. ... They are now and then mothers and daughters. But almost without exception they are shown in their relation to men. It was strange to think that all the great women of fiction were, until Jane Austen's day, not only seen by the other sex, but seen only in relation to the other sex. And how small a part of a woman's life is that ...

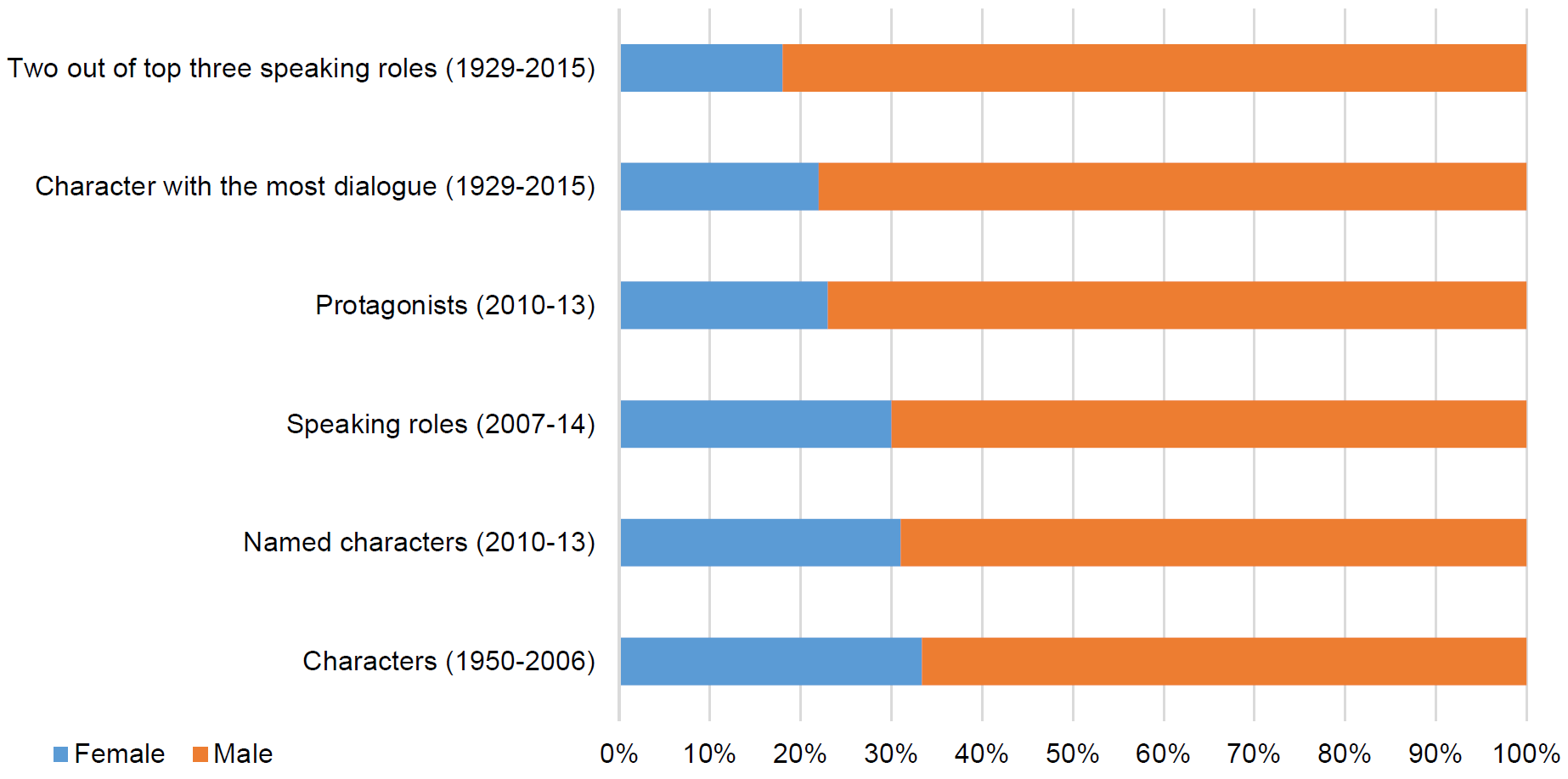
Female and male characters in film, according to four studies

In film, a study of gender portrayals in 855 of the most financially successful U.S. films from 1950 to 2006 showed that there were, on average, two male characters for each female character, a ratio that remained stable over time. Women were twice as likely as men to be involved in sexual activity, and this only continued to increase over time.

According to a 2014 study by the Geena Davis Institute on Gender in Media, in 120 films made worldwide from 2010 to 2013, only 31% of named characters were female, and 23% of the films had a female protagonist or co-protagonist. 7% of directors were women. Another study looking at the 700 top-grossing films from 2007 to 2014 found that only 30% of the speaking characters were female. In a 2016 analysis of screenplays of 2,005 commercially successful films, Hanah Anderson and Matt Daniels found that in 82% of the films, men had two of the top three speaking roles, while a woman had the most dialogue in only 22% of films.

=== Criteria and variants ===
A character in Dykes to Watch Out For explains the rules that later came to be known as the Bechdel test (1985).

The rules now known as the Bechdel test first appeared in 1985, in Alison Bechdel's comic strip, Dykes to Watch Out For. In a strip titled "The Rule", two women, who resemble the future characters Lois and Ginger, discuss seeing a film and one woman explains that she only goes to a movie if it satisfies the following requirements:

- The movie has to have at least two women in it,
- who talk to each other,
- about something other than a man.

The other woman acknowledges that the idea is fairly strict, but good. Not finding any films that meet their requirements, they go home together. The context of the strip may have referred to alienation of queer women in film and entertainment, where the only possible way for a queer woman to imagine any of the characters in any film may also be queer was if they satisfied the requirements of the test, but it has wider feminist implications, pointing out that women in movies are rarely seen outside of their relationship to men.

The test has also been referred to as the "Bechdel–Wallace test" (which Bechdel herself prefers), the "Bechdel rule", "Bechdel's law", or the "Mo movie measure". Bechdel credited the idea for the test to a friend and karate training partner, Liz Wallace, whose name appears in the marquee of the strip. She later wrote that she was pretty certain that Wallace was inspired by Woolf's A Room of One's Own.

Several variants of the test have been proposed—for example, that the two women must be named characters, or that there must be at least a total of 60 seconds of conversation. The test has also attracted academic interest from a computational analysis approach. In June 2018, the term "Bechdel test" was added to the Oxford English Dictionary.

According to Neda Ulaby, the test resonates because "it articulates something often missing in popular culture: not the number of women we see on screen, but the depth of their stories, and the range of their concerns". Dean Spade and Craig Willse described the test as a "commentary on how media representations enforce harmful gender norms" by depicting women's relationships to men more than any other relationships, and women's lives as important only insofar as they relate to men.

=== Use in film and television industry ===
The test moved into mainstream criticism in the 2010s and has been described as "the standard by which feminist critics judge television, movies, books, and other media". In 2013, Internet culture website The Daily Dot described it as "almost a household phrase, common shorthand to capture whether a film is woman-friendly". The failure of major Hollywood productions to pass the test, such as Pacific Rim (2013), was addressed in-depth in the media. In 2013, four Swedish cinemas and the Scandinavian cable television channel Viasat Film incorporated the Bechdel test into some of their ratings, a move supported by the Swedish Film Institute.

In 2014, the European cinema fund Eurimages incorporated the Bechdel test into its submission mechanism as part of an effort to collect information about gender equality in its projects. It requires "a Bechdel analysis of the script to be supplied by the script readers".

In 2018, screenwriting software developers began incorporating functions that allow writers to analyze their scripts for gender representation. Software with such functions includes Highland 2, WriterDuet and Final Draft 11.

== Application ==
In addition to films, the Bechdel test has been applied to other media such as television series, video games and comics. In theater, British actor Beth Watson launched a "Bechdel Theatre" campaign in 2015 that aims to highlight test-passing plays.

=== Pass and fail proportions ===
The website bechdeltest.com is a user-edited database of over 10,000 films classified by whether they pass the test. As of 2026, it listed 57% of films in its database as passing all three of the test's requirements, 10% as failing one, 22% as failing two, and 11% as failing all three.

According to Mark Harris of Entertainment Weekly, if passing the test were mandatory, it would have jeopardized half of the 2009 Academy Award for Best Picture nominees. The news website Vocativ, when subjecting the top-grossing films of 2013 to the Bechdel test, concluded that roughly half of them passed (although some dubiously) and the other half failed.

A 2018 BBC analysis revealed that among the 89 films that won the Academy Award for Best Picture, 44 (49%) successfully met the criteria of the Bechdel test. The study found that a higher percentage of Best Picture winners passed in the 1930s than in 2018. A 2022 study found that 49.6% of the 1,200 most popular movies globally over the previous 40 years passed the Bechdel test.

Writer Charles Stross noted that about half of the films that do pass the test only do so because the women talk about marriage or babies. Works that fail the test include some that are mainly about or aimed at women, or which do feature prominent female characters. The television series Sex and the City highlights its own failure to pass the test by having one of the four female main characters ask: "How does it happen that four such smart women have nothing to talk about but boyfriends? It's like seventh grade with bank accounts!".

Films set in alternative or future worlds, such as fantasy and science fiction, are more likely to pass the Bechdel test. This may be because these genres are more likely to avoid traditional gender roles and stereotypes.

=== Financial aspects ===
Several analyses have indicated that passing the Bechdel test is associated with a film's financial success. Vocativ's authors found that the films from 2013 that passed the test earned a total of $4.22 billion in the United States, while those that failed earned $2.66 billion in total, leading them to conclude that a way for Hollywood to make more money might be to "put more women onscreen". A 2014 study by FiveThirtyEight based on data from about 1,615 films released from 1990 to 2013 concluded that the median budget of films that passed the test was 35% lower than that of the others. It found that the films that passed the test had about a 37 percent higher return on investment (ROI) in the United States, and an equal ROI internationally, compared to films that did not pass the test. In 2018, the Creative Artists Agency and Shift7 analyzed revenue and budget data from the 350 top-grossing films of 2014 to 2017 in the United States. They concluded that female-led films financially outperformed other films, and that those that passed the Bechdel test (60% of the films studied) significantly outperformed the others. They noted that of films since 2012 which took in more than one billion dollars in revenue, all passed the test.

A research study from 2022 showed that production budget was negatively associated with the probability of passing the Bechdel test across 1200 movies from 1980 to 2019. However, the observed increase of films passing across years was stronger for higher budget films. Increases of movies passing the Bechdel test over the years from 1980 to 2019 were also stronger for movies with higher revenues, and higher audience evaluations (IMDb ratings).

=== Explanations ===
Explanations that have been offered as to why many films fail the Bechdel test include the relative lack of gender diversity among scriptwriters and other movie professionals, also called the "celluloid ceiling": In 2012, one in six of the directors, writers, and producers behind the 100 most commercially successful movies in the United States was a woman.

Writing in the American conservative magazine National Review in 2017, film critic Kyle Smith suggested that the reason for the Bechdel test results was that, "Hollywood movies are about people on the extremes of society—cops, criminals, superheroes—[which] tend to be men." Such films, according to Smith, were more often created by men because "women's movie ideas" were mostly about relationships and "aren't commercial enough for Hollywood studios". He considered the Bechdel test just as meaningless as a test asking whether a film contained cowboys. Smith's article provoked vigorous criticism. Alessandra Maldonado and Liz Bourke wrote that Smith was wrong to contend that female authors do not write books that generate "big movie ideas", citing J. K. Rowling, Margaret Atwood, and Nnedi Okorafor, among others as counter-examples.

== Limitations ==
The Bechdel test only indicates whether women are present in a work of fiction to a certain degree. A work may pass the test and still contain sexist content, and a work with prominent female characters may fail the test. A work may fail the test for reasons unrelated to gender bias, such as because its setting makes the inclusion of women unlikely (e.g., Umberto Eco's The Name of the Rose, set in a medieval monastery). On the other hand, the majority of Gravity is carried by an actress, but as the only other protagonist is male, the film fails the test. What counts as a character or as a conversation is not defined. For example, the Sir Mix-a-Lot song "Baby Got Back" has been described as passing the Bechdel test, because it begins with a valley girl saying to another "oh my god, Becky, look at her butt".

In an attempt at a quantitative analysis of works as to whether they pass the test, at least one researcher, Faith Lawrence, noted that the results depend on how rigorously the test is applied. For example, if a man is mentioned at any point in a conversation that also covers other topics, it is not clear whether this means that the conversation meets or fails the test. Another question is how one defines the start and end of a conversation.

== Criticism ==
In response to its increasing ubiquity in film criticism, the Bechdel test has been criticized for not taking into account the quality of the works it tests ("bad" films may pass it, and "good" ones fail). According to Andi Zeisler, this criticism indicates the problem that the test's utility "has been elevated way beyond the original intention. Where Bechdel and Wallace expressed it as simply a way to point out the rote, unthinkingly normative plotlines of mainstream film, these days passing it has somehow become synonymous with 'being feminist'. It was never meant to be a measure of feminism, but rather a cultural barometer." Zeisler noted that the false assumption that a work that passes the test is "feminist" might lead to creators "gaming the system" by adding just enough women characters and dialogue to pass the test, while continuing to deny women substantial representation outside of formulaic plots. Similarly, the critic Alyssa Rosenberg expressed concern that the Bechdel test could become another "fig leaf" for the entertainment industry, who could just "slap a few lines of dialogue onto a hundred-and-forty-minute compilation of CGI explosions" to pass off the result as feminist.

The Telegraph film critic Robbie Collin disapproved of the test as prizing "box-ticking and stat-hoarding over analysis and appreciation", and suggested that the focus should be on whether a given film has well-drawn female characters, rather than on whether it passes or fails the Bechdel test. FiveThirtyEight's writer Walt Hickey noted that the test does not measure whether a film is a model of gender equality, or has well written, significant or deeply explored female characters but he considered it "the best test on gender equity in film we have", as well as "the only test we have data on".

The Bechdel test stirred a minor controversy in 2022 when writer Hanna Rosin invoked it in a tweet to criticize the gay romantic comedy Fire Island. Rosin's tweet was criticized for attempting to apply the test to a film about gay Asian men, a marginalized group; some noted that it was not the type of film the Bechdel Test was designed to evaluate. In response, Alison Bechdel humorously posted on Twitter that she had added a "corollary" to the test, whereby a film passes the test if it includes "two men talking to each other about the female protagonist of an Alice Munro story in a screenplay structured on a Jane Austen novel" (this being a description of the plot of Fire Island).

== Derived tests ==
The Bechdel test has inspired others, notably feminist and antiracist critics and fans, to formulate criteria for evaluating works of fiction, in part because of the Bechdel test's limitations. In interviews conducted by FiveThirtyEight, women in the film and television industry proposed many other tests that included more women, better stories, women behind the scenes, and more diversity.

=== Tests about gender and fiction ===
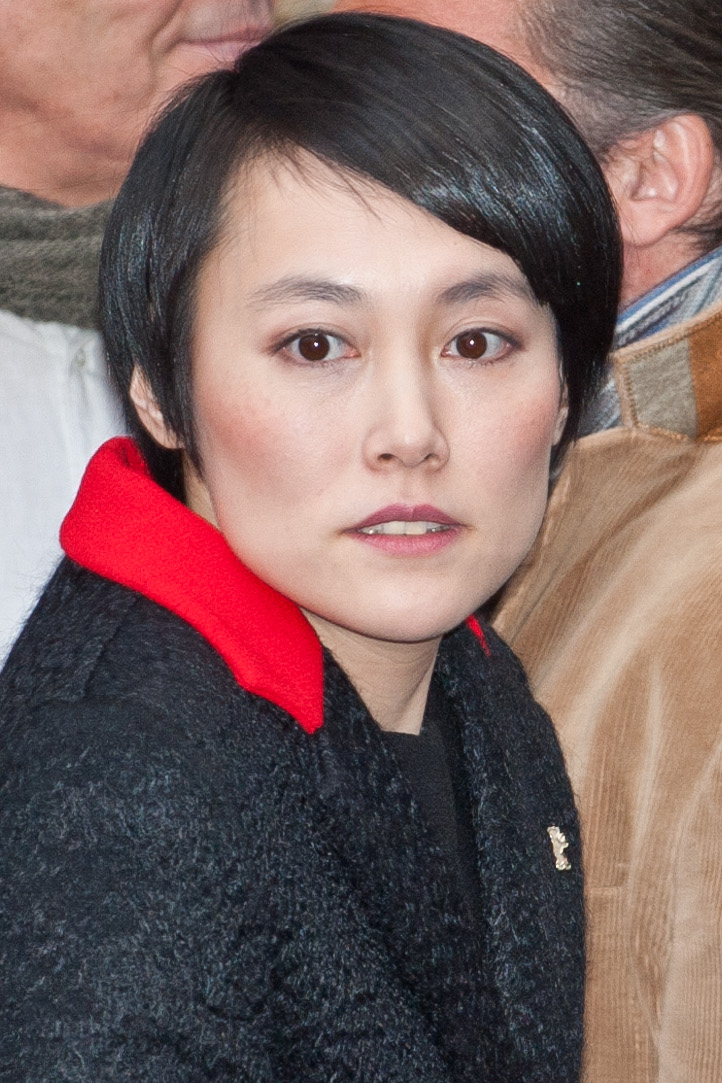
The character Mako Mori (played by Rinko Kikuchi, pictured) inspired an alternative test for measuring female presence in fiction.

The "Kumbalangi Test" asks if a film features a man who talks to any other person about any vulnerability other than anger and victimhood. It was proposed in an essay and named for the Malayalam language film Kumbalangi Nights.

The "reverse Bechdel test" asks whether a work features men who talk to men about something other than a woman. A 2022 study that analyzed 341 popular films of the last 40 years showed that almost all (95%) passed the reverse Bechdel test, speaking to a much stronger representation of men than women.

The Mako Mori test, formulated by Tumblr user "Chaila" and named after the only significant female character of the 2013 film Pacific Rim, asks whether a female character has a narrative arc that is not about supporting a man's story. Comic book writer Kelly Sue DeConnick proposed a "sexy lamp test": "If you can replace your female character with a sexy lamp and the story still basically works, maybe you need another draft."

The "Sphinx test" by the Sphinx Theatre Company of London asks about the interaction of women with other characters, as well as how prominently female characters feature in the action, how proactive or reactive they are, and whether they are portrayed stereotypically. It was conceived to "encourage theatremakers to think about how to write more and better roles for women", in reaction to research indicating that 37% of theater roles were written for women as of 2014.

Johanson analysis, developed by film critic MaryAnn Johanson, provides a method to evaluate the representation of women and girls in movies. Although developed for the screen, it can also be applied to books and other media. It consists of adding or subtracting points based on different categories of representation. The analysis evaluates media on criteria that include the basic representation of women, female agency, power and authority, the male gaze, and issues of gender and sexuality. Johanson's 2015 study compiled statistics for every film that was widely released in the United States in 2015, and all those nominated for Oscars in 2014 or 2015. She finds that only 22% of films had a female protagonists; also, films with better female representation have smaller budgets but are just as likely to return a profit as more male-skewing films, making films with better representation on average a less risky investment.

=== Tests about other characteristics ===
==== LGBTQ people ====
The "Vito Russo test" created by the LGBTQ organization GLAAD tests for the representation of LGBTQ characters in films. It asks, "does the film contain a character that is identifiably LGBT, and is not solely or predominantly defined by their sexual orientation or gender identity, as well as tied into the plot in such a way that their removal would have a significant effect?".

==== People of color ====
A test proposed by TV critic Eric Deggans asks whether a film that is not about race has at least two non-white characters in the main cast, and similarly, writer Nikesh Shukla proposed a test about whether "two ethnic minorities talk to each other for more than five minutes about something other than race". Johanson analysis includes a rating of films on their representation of women of color.

The New York Times film critic Manohla Dargis suggested in January 2016 the "DuVernay test" (named for director Ava DuVernay), asking whether "African-Americans and other minorities have fully realized lives rather than serve as scenery in white stories". It aims to point out the lack of people of color in Hollywood movies, through a measure of their importance to a particular movie or the lack of a gratuitous link to white actors.

Nadia Latif and Leila Latif of The Guardian suggested in 2016 a series of five questions:

- Are there two named characters of color?
- Do they have dialogue?
- Are they not romantically involved with one another?
- Do they have any dialogue that isn't comforting or supporting a white character?
- Is one of them definitely not a magical negro?

For Bella Caledonia, poet Raman Mundair contrasted Sandra Oh's character in Killing Eve lacking any reference to her Korean heritage until she "has hit a complete emotional and psychological rock bottom" with the "authentic, true and engaging" Black characters in Michaela Coel's I May Destroy You in order to suggest a more-detailed test of "representation that exists outside the context of whiteness". Making reference to British East and Southeast Asian media advocacy group BEATS's 3-question test, in 2021, Mundair proposed criteria for how theatrical and broadcasting performances should represent people of color; these include characters being rooted in their communities and not dependent on white people for their happiness.

In 2018, culture critic Clarkisha Kent created the "Kent Test", which uses a point system to grade a story's representation of women of color. Stories lose points for fetishizing women of color characters or making them a "final sacrifice".

The "Ali Nahdee Test" (formerly the "Aila Test"), created by Ali Nahdee on her Tumblr blog, tests representation of Indigenous women in media. To pass, a story must have an indigenous woman main character who does not fall in love with a white man and who is not raped or killed.

==== Muslims ====
A 2017 speech by Riz Ahmed inspired the Riz test about the nature of Muslim representation in fiction. The Riz Test has five parts which, according to the creators, serve to highlight and combat the stereotypes of Muslims found in characters in films and on TV:

- If a character is identifiably Muslim, is the character talking about, the victim of, or the perpetrator of terrorism?
- Presented as irrationally angry?
- Presented as superstitious, culturally backward or anti-modern?
- Presented as a threat to a Western way of life?
- If the character is male, is he presented as misogynistic? or if female, is she presented as oppressed by her male counterparts?

==== Orthodox Jews ====
Following a controversy over misrepresentation of Orthodox Judaism in television, the nonprofit organization Jew in the City proposed the "Josephs test" for depictions of Orthodox Jews in fiction. The test includes four questions:

- Are there any Orthodox characters who are emotionally and psychologically stable?
- Are there characters who are Orthodox whose religious life is a characteristic but not a plot point or a problem?
- Can the Orthodox character find their Happily Ever After as a religious Jew?
- And if the main plot points are in conflict due to religious observance—are any characters not Hasidic or Haredi and have the writers actually researched authentic religious observance from practicing members of the community they are attempting to portray?

=== Tests about the environment ===
The Bechdel test inspired a test for the presence of climate change in narratives. The "Climate Reality Check", a "Bechdel–Wallace test for a world on fire", was introduced in March 2024 and applied to the 2023 Oscar nominees. Its release was covered by NPR, Variety, The Hollywood Reporter, and other websites. The test is intended to be applied to "any story set on Earth, which takes place now, in the recent past, or in the future. It doesn't apply to high fantasy or to stories set on other planets or in the distant past." It includes two components:

- Climate change exists
- And a character knows it.

=== Tests about nonfiction ===
The Bechdel test has also inspired gender-related tests for nonfiction. Laurie Voss, at the time CTO of npm, proposed a Bechdel test for software: source code passes this test if it contains a function written by a woman developer which calls a function written by a different woman developer. Press notice was attracted after the U.S. government agency 18F analyzed their own software according to this metric.

The Bechdel test also inspired the Finkbeiner test, a checklist to help journalists to avoid gender bias in articles about women in science, and Danielle Kranjec's "Kranjec test" of including sources written by someone who is not male on any source sheet in Torah study.

The Gray test, intended to improve citational practices, is named after and was created with the scholar Kishonna Gray. It requires that scholarly nonfiction texts cite the scholarship of "at least two [authors who identify as] women and two nonwhite [Black, Latino, or Indigenous] authors but also must mention it meaningfully in the body of the text". Like the Bechdel test, this was created as a "baseline test for establishing a bare minimum for responsible citation; it is not an aspirational test for best practices". It is being used by scholars and academic journals to vet articles.

== See also ==
- Damsel in distress – Trope and stock character in storytelling
- Finkbeiner test – Checklist to help journalists avoid gender bias
- Johanson analysis – Method to evaluate representation of women in fiction
- Manic Pixie Dream Girl – Female stock character who acts as a love interest
- Mary Sue – Overly competent fictional character
- The Bechdel Cast – Comedy podcast
- Reverse harem – gender opposite of a "straight" harem
- Smurfette principle – Having only one female character in an ensemble
- Tokenism – Making a perfunctory or symbolic effort towards including minority groups
- Women in refrigerators/Fridging – Literary trope
