= Dreadnought! =

1986 novel by Diane Carey

- Cover of the first edition
- Author: Diane Carey
- Cover artist: Boris Vallejo
- Language: English
- Series: Star Trek: The Original Series
- Genre: Science fiction
- Publisher: Pocket Books
- Publication date: 1 May 1986
- Publication place: United States
- Media type: Print (Paperback)
- Pages: 252
- ISBN: 0-671-61873-3
- OCLC: 13571480
- Preceded by: Crisis on Centaurus
- Followed by: Demons
- Text: Dreadnought! at Internet Archive

Dreadnought! is a Star Trek: The Original Series novel written by Diane Carey. It is written in the first person from the perspective of Lieutenant Piper.

== Plot ==
The novel begins with Lt. Piper (no last name), a native of Proxima Beta, taking the Kobayashi Maru simulation at Starfleet Academy. After her "ship" takes several hits and sustains heavy damage, Lt. Piper uses an unusual method to issue commands to the ship's computer via handheld communicator. The technique results in the computer controlling the simulation crashing. The simulator's commander comments during the debriefing that she has come closer to checkmating the no-win scenario than any other command-line candidate, then tells her that she has been reassigned to the starship Enterprise by special request.

Lt. Piper meets briefly with Brian Silayna, an academy cadet in the engineering program and her friend and lover. Piper and Silayna had originally been assigned to the same ship, but with Piper's reassignment (which Silayna reveals was from Captain Kirk, who had been observing the Kobayashi Maru simulation) they wind up saying their goodbyes instead.

Lt. Piper takes a shuttle to the Enterprise and reports to her assigned cabin. Here she meets her cabin-mates: a Gorn named Telosirizharcrede, a human from Earth named Judd "Scanner" Sandage, a humanoid from Altair Four named Merete AndrusTaurus, and a Vulcan named Sarda. It is revealed that Piper and Sarda have a history together which has generated animosity between them.

Shortly thereafter, Lt. Piper is summoned to the bridge where she finds out that a top-secret Federation vessel named Star Empire, first of a new class of heavily armed and shielded dreadnought, has been stolen by persons unknown and that the Enterprise has been dispatched in pursuit. The head of the dreadnought project, Vice-Admiral Rittenhouse, is in pursuit as well aboard the destroyer Pompeii. She also finds out that the Star Empire has transmitted rendezvous coordinates to the Enterprise and that Piper's unique biocode would be needed to enable transmissions at the rendezvous point.

After a conference, Piper retires to her cabin and has a conversation with AndrusTaurus, where it is revealed why Sarda and Piper have strained relations. Sarda has a talent for defensive weapons design, which Starfleet keeps developing for offensive uses as well and that is something which Vulcans considered immoral. Piper, in her ignorance, informed the academy staff of Sarda's talents, which led to his great personal embarrassment and being ostracized by other Vulcans in Starfleet. Piper and AndrusTaurus do some research on Vulcan and decide to consult with a Vulcan embassy that specialized in human-Vulcan relationships.

Upon arrival at the rendezvous point, the Enterprise finds Star Empire being attacked by four Klingon vessels. The Star Empire is apparently helpless, its crew unable to fight while the attacking Klingons inflict heavy damage on the dreadnought with phaser fire. Enterprise moves in to help the crippled dreadnought, engaging the Klingons with phasers and photon torpedoes. One is damaged and retreats to hide in an asteroid field. Hard fighting results in another Klingon ship being destroyed. However, the Enterprise is also damaged in the fighting and is left facing long odds against the two remaining Klingon ships. Suddenly, movement is detected in the asteroid field, and a second Star Empire appears. Engaging the damaged Klingon ships with heavy photon torpedoes, this unhurt Star Empire destroys two of them and sends the last one fleeing. Then it is revealed that the damaged Star Empire is in fact a sophisticated sensor projection when it dissolves from sight shortly thereafter, followed by the creation of five more dreadnought projections. This projection device is one of Sarda's weapons projects he finds embarrassing.

Captain Kirk hails the Star Empire and after Piper's biocode is transmitted communication is established. To everybody's great surprise, Brian Silayna appears on the screen. He reads a message from Commander Paul Burch stating that they have seized the dreadnaught in the name of galactic civility and request an ambassadorial party of Kirk, Piper, and a Vulcan. Kirk refuses to comply and orders Piper arrested for conspiracy with terrorists, then cuts the transmission. Kirk orders the security guards to confine Piper to her quarters.

In her quarters, Piper reflects on the situation and decides she had to get over to Star Empire to find out what was going on, why Silayna was on the dreadnought, and why he had never revealed his intentions to her. She tricks open the door by cutting the fire-alarm circuits to the bridge then triggering the heat sensor with a curling iron so that the safety features override the door lock and lets her out.

Piper runs to the nearest transporter room and begins to activate the equipment with the intention of beaming over to Star Empire. Sarda finds her there, having deduced her intentions and location after discovering her missing from her quarters, and informs her that the Star Empire has moved out of transporter range. Instead, they move to the hangar bay, open the doors, steal a 2-seat Arco-class light attack "sled", and head towards the Star Empire. During the flight Sarda informs Piper that 3 more starships (Hood, Lincoln, and Potemkin) have been ordered by Admiral Rittenhouse to the location, and also accidentally reveals another benevolent invention that Starfleet weaponized and that he is embarrassed about.

Their trip to Star Empire is cut short, however when the destroyer Pompeii drops out of warp, intercepts the attack sled and uses a tractor beam to haul it inside its hangar bay. They meet Vice-Admiral Rittenhouse, who informs them that Commander Burch was his personal aide but had deteriorated until Rittenhouse believed he had become sociopathic. They discuss the situation of Piper and Sarda briefly with Captain Kirk, then Rittenhouse discusses the recent galactic political situation and hints at his desire to unite the various galactic governments under a common flag of peace. He then leaves the conference room to attend to other duties.

Piper, sensing something in the hints that Rittenhouse dropped, uses the destroyer's computer to access Starfleet and Federation organizational charts. She and Sarda find a disturbing pattern: men that had served with Rittenhouse over the years had been placed in high levels of the civilian and military leadership, including the captains of the three other starships en route. Believing Rittenhouse may be planning a military coup, Piper tries to contact the Enterprise, but Rittenhouse and Dr. Boma, a civilian scientist who also worked on the dreadnought project, stop her and order Piper and Sarda thrown in the destroyer's brig.

While in the brig Piper and Sarda discuss Earth history and Piper explains the pattern of socialist political, military, and economic changes that Rittenhouse is repeating and how it would affect the Federation and its galactic neighbors. Suddenly, the power to the brig is briefly interrupted (by Boma, after he realizes Rittenhouse's plans for Star Empire's crew), and Sarda acts quickly, throwing himself through the cell's doorway before the forcefield could re-activate. Sarda then turns off the forcefield and he and Piper flee the detention area.

Moving through the destroyer, they spy the senior officers from the Enterprise and three other starships walking through the Pompeii’s corridor into the conference room. Fearing for the safety of Kirk and his officers, Sarda and Piper move to the engineering section, bluff past the engineers there, and find an isolated spot from which to contact the Enterprise. Sarda contacts AndrusTaurus and Sandage, who transport over. With Sandage's help they manage to use the ship's intercom system to listen in on the meeting.

During the meeting, Rittenhouse and his hand-picked captains square off against Kirk, with Rittenhouse advocating for harsh measures and being indifferent to the potential deaths of the crew on Star Empire; while Kirk advocates for talks and negotiation with the Star Empire. Kirk becomes increasingly suspicious of Rittenhouse's unwillingness to let him contact the dreadnought's crew and Rittenhouse's disregard for their lives and balks. Rittenhouse finally orders security to arrest Kirk and his officers and lock them in a stateroom.

Piper, Sarda, Sandage, and AndrusTaurus surprise and disable the guards outside the stateroom and stage an effort to free Kirk and his officers. They find that Kirk and his officers have disabled the guards inside their room and were planning to come and rescue them. They then sabotage the Pompeii's phasers before meeting in the transporter room. Kirk, Spock, Scott, and McCoy beam back first; however, before the others can leave the Pompeii's crew disable the transporter.

They move immediately to the hangar bay; where they have another encounter with a security team. A fight ensues, ending when AndrusTaurus grabs a guard's dropped phaser and shoots him with it. Against regulations the phaser is set to disintegrate instead of stun and the guard is vaporized. AndrusTaurus feels horrible guilt about her action as they continue to flee to the hangar deck.

Once at the deck, they are confronted by Rittenhouse and more guards. Piper threatens to self-destruct the Arco attack sled they arrived on and take the destroyer with it. Rittenhouse, seeing that she's serious, withdraws from the deck and allows them to escape. The four of them escape in two attack sleds, skimming along the destroyer's hull to avoid being shot by the Pompeii's phaser batteries. Piper destroys one phaser bank, then the two sleds vector away from the destroyer and towards the Star Empire before the Pompeii can bring more phasers to bear.

They escape to the Star Empire and rush to the bridge. There they find a skeleton, untrained, largely bureaucratic crew that has only basic control over the ship's systems. Commander Burch explains the situation and they try to contact the Enterprise. Pompeii tries to jam the signal, and when that fails the destroyer opens fire on the ill-prepared Star Empire. A fierce battle then ensues. The Pompeii's phasers were disabled after the initial shots, leaving three other starships against Enterprise and Star Empire.

Piper is able to unlock the ship's systems, giving Star Empire increased shielding and weapons ability to withstand the heavy attacks by the opposing starships. However Star Empire still takes significant damage, as Burch is not a combat commander and is reluctant to fire on other Federation vessels. Enterprise feigns fatal damage, luring Rittenhouse to order two other starships in to evacuate the Enterprise crew. Kirk then fires on the two starships, inflicting heavy damage and evening the odds. The two sides maneuver warily, until Commander Burch is disabled in an attack. Piper is forced to take command of Star Empire and begins to move aggressively, using the dreadnought's multiple phaser banks and newly activated secondary shielding to dish out heavy hits on the opposing starships. With Rittenhouse's three starships considerably damaged, Piper bluffs their commanders by arming Star Empire's heavy photon torpedoes, a single hit from which would destroy any of the damaged starships killing all on board. Rittenhouse's ships fall back, and Star Empire presses in.

Rittenhouse, seeing that he no longer has the upper hand and that victory is out of reach, orders Pompeii to make a suicide run on Star Empire. Kirk, seeing this, moves in quickly and destroys Pompeii before she can collide with Star Empire.

With Rittenhouse dead, the commanders of his three other starships surrender. The novel ends with medals being awarded to several of the crew and Piper gets promoted to Lieutenant Commander. Then Captain Kirk extends an offer to Piper to go sailing with him on his schooner.

== Reception and characterization ==
The novel made the New York Times best-seller list for paperbacks on May 18 and May 25, 1986. Robert Greenberger called the book "a page turner" but noted that "One more time, however, a brave, plucky, courageous woman holds the key to success."

In a reply to Greenberger's review, Carey commented:

I'm not much of a feminist myself—I'm more of a people-ist. Piper is only female because I am and she is my alter ego (Boris Vallejo even put myself and my husband on the cover, speaking of fannish wishes). Only success in women's fiction forced me to use female main characters when I actually preferred males, but that's the fallout of being a professional. Now I do whatever works. I make no conscious sexual statements, and wonder if the "plucky female" observation would have been brought up at all if the characters had been plucky males.

The hero of the story, Lt. Piper, has been cited as an example of Mary Sue characterization. Greg Brodeur, Carey's husband and editor, commented in an interview that "According to the fans who write to us, everybody wants to be her."

== See also ==
- Battlestations!, a sequel
