= Ann Finkbeiner =

American science journalist

- Occupation: Science Journalist

Ann Finkbeiner is a science writer who has contributed to various publications including Scientific American, Nature, Science, Hakai Magazine, Quanta Magazine, Discover, Sky & Telescope, and Astronomy.

== Finkbeiner test ==
The Finkbeiner test is named after her. The test is a checklist to help science journalists avoid gender bias in articles about women in science. Finkbeiner is an English major, and for 20 years taught and directed a graduate science-writing program at Johns Hopkins University in Baltimore, Maryland.

== Career ==
Finkbeiner has written columns for USA Today and Defense Technology International (now defunct) and her book reviews have appeared in The Wall Street Journal, The New York Times, and Nature.

Finkbeiner is a co-proprietor of the science blog The Last Word on Nothing.

== Books ==
- A Grand and Bold Thing.
- The Jasons.
- After the Death of a Child.

== Articles ==
- Ann Finkbeiner, "Orbital Aggression: How do we prevent war in space?", Scientific American, vol. 323, no. 5 (November 2020), pp. 50–57.
