= Battlestations! =

1986 novel by Diane Carey

- Author: Diane Carey
- Cover artist: Boris Vallejo
- Language: English
- Series: Star Trek: The Original Series
- Genre: Science fiction
- Publisher: Pocket Books
- Publication date: 15 November 1986
- Publication place: United States
- Media type: Print (paperback)
- Pages: 274
- ISBN: 0-671-74025-3 (first edition, paperback)
- Preceded by: Demons
- Followed by: Chain of Attack
- Text: Battlestations! at Internet Archive

Battlestations! is a science fiction novel by American writer Diane Carey, part of the Star Trek: The Original Series franchise.

== Plot ==
Lt. Commander Piper is taking a vacation from Starfleet following the events of the novel Dreadnought!, in which she prevented a military coup from taking over the Federation. However she is swept up into intrigue when Captain Kirk is arrested for the theft of transwarp drive, a new technology which could radically shift the balance of power across the galaxy. Piper, Commander Spock, and Dr. McCoy attempt to solve the mystery as the major powers of the galaxy scramble for the new technology.

== Reception ==
Mark Chappell of TV Zone described the novel as "a cut above the standard fare of Titan's Star Trek novels" though it was "not as fresh as Dreadnought".
