= The Borgia Bride =

2005 novel by Jeanne Kalogridis

- First UK edition
- Author: Jeanne Kalogridis
- Publisher: HarperCollins
- Publication date: 2005

The Borgia Bride is a 2005 novel by American writer Jeanne Kalogridis, portraying life in the Borgia dynasty through the eyes of Princess Sancha of Aragon. It is set in Italy in the year 1492, and involves a scheming Pope Alexander VI. The incestuous relationship between Cesare Borgia and Lucrezia Borgia is a major plot point in the novel. USA Today critic Deirdre Donahue felt that Sarah Bradford's Lucrezia Borgia: Life, Love and Death in Renaissance Italy (2004) gave a more sympathetic portrayal of Lucrezia than Kalogridis's novel. Ruth Meech in the Dorset Echo stated "Historical fact and political intrigue are all here, densely wrapped in bodice-ripping fiction. This is great fun from the off."
