= Finkbeiner test =

Checklist to help journalists avoid gender bias

The Finkbeiner test, named for the science journalist Ann Finkbeiner, is a checklist to help science journalists avoid gender bias in articles about women in science. It asks writers to avoid describing women scientists in terms of stereotypically feminine traits, such as their family arrangements.

The Finkbeiner test has been linked to affirmative action, because writing can cause readers to view women in science as different from men in negative or unfair ways. The test helps avoid gender bias in science reporting similarly to various tests that focus on under-representation of marginalized groups in different career fields.

== Checklist ==
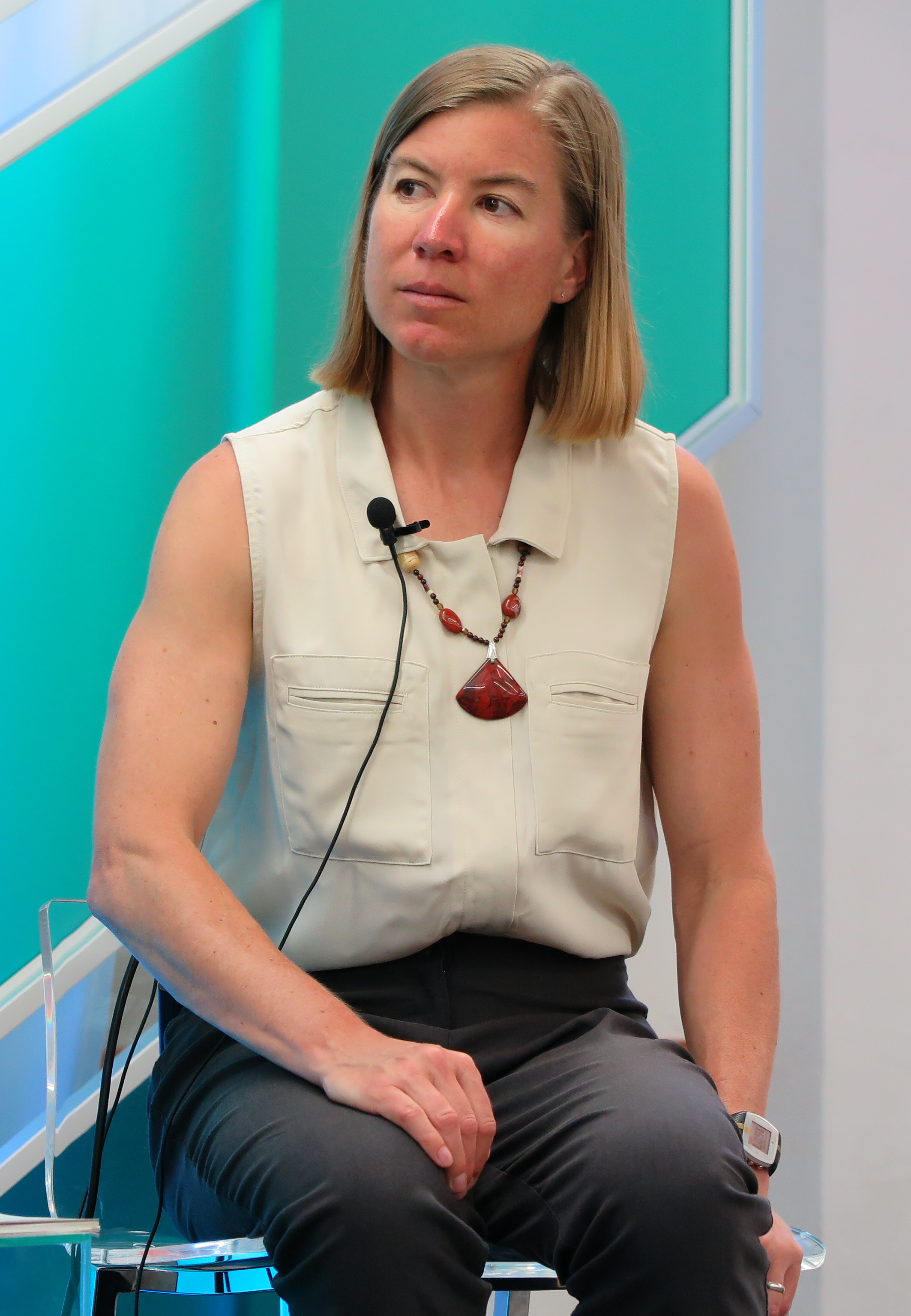
Aschwanden at the Aspen Ideas Festival in 2015

The Finkbeiner test is a checklist proposed by freelance journalist Christie Aschwanden to help journalists avoid gender bias in media articles about women in science. To pass the test, an article about a female scientist must not mention:

- That she is a woman
- The employment of her husband
- Her childcare arrangements
- How she raises her children
- How she was taken aback by the competitiveness in her field
- How she is a role model for other women
- How she was the "first woman" to perform a thing

== History ==
Aschwanden formulated the test in a 2013 article for the online magazine Double X Science. She created the test in the spirit of (but was not inspired by) the Bechdel test – used to highlight gender bias in film – in response to the sexist media coverage of women scientists she noticed. She recalled:

Campaigns to recognize outstanding female scientists have led to a recognizable genre of media coverage. Let's call it "A lady who..." genre. You've seen these profiles, of course you have, because they're everywhere. The hallmark of "A lady who..." profile is that it treats its subject's sex as her most defining detail. She's not just a great scientist, she's a woman! And if she's also a wife and a mother, those roles get emphasized too.

Aschwanden named the test after journalist Ann Finkbeiner, winner of the 2008 AIP Science Communication Award, who had earlier written a post for the science blog The Last Word on Nothing about her decision not to write about the subject of her latest profile, an astronomer, "as a woman".

Both journalists agree that the test "should apply mainly to the sort of general-interest scientist profiles that one might find in The New York Times or the front section of Nature, which are supposed to focus on professional accomplishments". The point of the test is to not overemphasize or privilege the gender of a female scientist. Even Finkbeiner, who vowed to "ignore gender" in her writing, actually tripped up on the tendency to focus on sex; in an astronomer's profile she considered mentioning that the scientist was the "first" to win a certain award. "After a reader urged Finkbeiner to stick to her pledge, she [left out 'the first.']" The tactic of singling out women as "role models" can also distort gender equality in the reception of news reporting. Students indiscriminately cite scholars and mentors of any sex or gender as "great role models"; being a role model is not unique to a person's gender. Thus, emphasizing sex in profiles about members of marginalized groups reinforces their supposed difference, perpetuating gender bias in science.

== Reception ==
The test was mentioned in the media criticism of The New York Times's obituary of rocket scientist Yvonne Brill. That obituary, published on 30 March 2013, by Douglas Martin, began with the words: "She made a mean beef stroganoff, followed her husband from job to job and took eight years off from work to raise three children". A few hours after publication The New York Times revised the obituary to address some of the criticisms; the revised version begins "She was a brilliant rocket scientist who followed her husband from job to job..."

Another New York Times article, on Jennifer Doudna, published on 11 May 2015, drew similar criticism with reference to the Finkbeiner test. An article in The Globe and Mail on astrophysicist Victoria Kaspi, published on 16 February 2016, drew the same criticism, as did David Quammen's book A Tangled Tree, for giving women scientists, especially Lynn Margulis, short shrift.

Susan Gelman, Professor of Psychology at the University of Michigan, applauded the move to report on female scientists without emphasising their gender, but questions whether the Finkbeiner test should seek to eliminate all references to personal life, suggesting that the move should be towards asking male scientists about personal issues too. This view is shared by other writers. In addition, Vasudevan Mukunth points out in The Wire that countries in which women are drastically under-represented in science might want to bend the test's rules in hopes of highlighting any systemic barriers: "The test's usefulness rests on the myth of a level playing field—there is none in India." In another post on Last Word on Nothing, Finkbeiner responded to these questions by arguing with herself.

== Reversed Finkbeiner ==
The "Reversed Finkbeiner" approach is an exercise in which students are asked to write an article about a male scientist that would fail the Finkbeiner test if it were about a woman.
