= I, Mona Lisa =

2006 historical novel by Jeanne Kalogridis

- UK edition of the novel
- Author: Jeanne Kalogridis
- Language: English language
- Genre: Historical novel
- Publisher: St. Martin's Griffin
- Publication date: 2006
- Publication place: United States

I, Mona Lisa (UK title Painting Mona Lisa) is a 2006 historical novel by Jeanne Kalogridis about Lisa di Antonio Gherardini, the model for Leonardo da Vinci's painting Mona Lisa.

== Plot ==
Lisa is portrayed as a young Italian woman who learns about the murder of Giuliano de' Medici, the brother of Lorenzo de' Medici in the Pazzi conspiracy in 1478. Giuliano's murder casts a shadow, especially as one of the killers has not been found.

She later falls in love with Giuliano's namesake, Lorenzo's son Giuliano in the aftermath of Girolamo Savonarola's uprising in the late 15th century.

== Reception ==
Library Journal rated the book as "highly recommended", comparing it to The Birth of Venus by Sarah Dunant and Leonardo's Swans by Karen Essex. Publishers Weekly called it a "fevered bodice ripper" which "invents a passionate woman behind La Gioconda's enigmatic smile".

Kirkus Reviews noted that while Kalogradis provided "plenty of cloak-and-dagger goings-on", "the characters ring more romantic than true, especially Leoardo".
