= Climate Reality Check =

Climate media storytelling tool

The Climate Reality Check is a tool designed to evaluate whether climate change is being represented in films, TV shows, and other narratives. Developed by Good Energy and Matthew Schneider-Mayerson, this test was inspired by the Bechdel Test (also known as the Bechdel-Wallace Test), which measures gender representation in media. The Climate Reality Check aims to ensure that climate change is depicted in on-screen stories.

== History ==
The Climate Reality Check was introduced to address the absence of climate change representation in popular media. The tool was developed through a collaboration between Good Energy, a nonprofit story consultancy, and Matthew Schneider-Mayerson, a researcher at Rice University. The goal was to create a simple yet effective measure to encourage the inclusion of climate-related themes in entertainment media. According to the official Climate Reality Check website, the tool was authored by Dr. Matthew Schneider-Mayerson, Carmiel Banasky, Bruno Olmedo Quiroga, and Anna Jane Joyner.

The Climate Reality Check made its first public debut on March 1st, 2024 on All Things Considered, a podcast produced by NPR.

== Criteria ==
To pass the Climate Reality Check, a narrative must meet the following criteria:

1. Climate change exists: The story must depict the presence of climate change through impacts or solutions. This can be shown through events like heatwaves, rising sea levels, or the use of renewable energy.

2. A character knows it: At least one character must demonstrate an awareness of climate change. This awareness can be shown through dialogue, narration, actions, or visual imagery, such as reading an article about climate change or discussing extreme weather events.

== Application ==
The Climate Reality Check has been applied to films across multiple studies led by different organizations.

A research team at the Buck Lab for Climate and Environment at Colby College, led by Dr. Matthew Schneider-Mayerson, used the Climate Reality Check to conduct a systematic content analysis of 250 of the most popular fictional films released between 2013 and 2022. They found that only 9.6% of the 250 films passed the Climate Reality Check. They also found that climate change was present in twice as many films released during the second half of the decade they examined (2018 to 2022) compared to the first half (2013 to 2017). Films that included at least one character who is aware of climate change (passing both parts of the test) performed 10% better at the box office than those that did not.

Note: Since the Climate Reality Check is intended to check whether films are reflecting the reality of climate change, films that are high fantasy, not set on Earth, set before 2006, or set after 2100 were excluded.

The Hollywood Reporter applied the Climate Reality Check to the 20 films that earned the most at the box office from 2018-2022. Of those 20 films, 4 passed the Climate Reality Check: Aquaman, Jurassic World Dominion, Venom and Fast & Furious Presents: Hobbs & Shaw — while The Batman passed only one element of the test

=== The Oscars ===
Thirty-one fictional, feature-length films received Oscar nominations in 2024. Of those, thirteen fit the Climate Reality Check's inclusion criteria: stories set in the present or near future, on Earth, in this universe. Those films were: Barbie, American Fiction, Anatomy of a Fall, Past Lives, May December, Nyad, Mission: Impossible—Dead Reckoning Part One, The Creator, Spider-Man: Across the Spider-Verse, Io Capitano, Perfect Days, The Teachers' Lounge, and Godzilla Minus One.

Of the nominated films coded, 23% (3 films) passed the Climate Reality Check. Those films were: Barbie, Mission: Impossible—Dead Reckoning Part One, and Nyad.
