= Yvonne Brill =

Canadian-American Rocket and Jet Propulsion Engineer

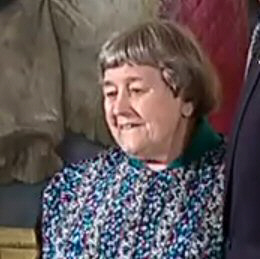
- Born: Yvonne Madalaine Claeys; December 30, 1924; Winnipeg, Manitoba, Canada
- Died: March 27, 2013 (aged 88); Princeton, New Jersey, US
- Education: University of Manitoba, University of Southern California
- Occupation: Aerospace Engineer Rocket Scientist
- Awards: AIAA Wyld Propulsion Award (2002); John Fritz Medal (2009); Inducted into the National Inventors Hall of Fame (2010); National Medal of Technology (2010)

Yvonne Madelaine Brill (née Claeys; December 30, 1924 – March 27, 2013) was a Canadian American rocket and jet propulsion engineer. She is responsible for inventing the Electrothermal Hydrazine Thruster (EHT/Resistojet), a fuel-efficient rocket thruster that keeps today’s satellites in orbit, and holds a patent for its invention. During her career she was involved in a broad range of national space programs in the United States, including NASA and the International Maritime Satellite Organization.

== Early life ==
Born in Winnipeg, Manitoba, Canada to Belgian immigrant parents, Yvonne Brill, was a first-generation Canadian. She was inspired to go to school by Amelia Earhart, the first woman pilot to fly across the Atlantic Ocean. Despite her desire to attend school, she faced several hurdles, her father encouraged her to open a shop in their hometown instead of pursuing additional education, and her high school physics teacher told her that "a woman would never get anywhere". She applied to the University of Manitoba's engineering program at 18, but was denied by the school, as they claimed that their mandatory summer camp did not have the necessary facilities to host female students. Despite this, Yvonne was the first in her family to go to college, graduating from the University of Manitoba in 1945 at the top of her class with a Bachelor of Science in Mathematics. She went on to study at the University of Southern California, where she took night classes and graduated in 1951 with a Master of Science in Physical Chemistry. Her denial to Manitoba’s school of engineering forever inspired her to encourage women in the sciences, and in her, forged an unwavering confidence against gender-based discrimination.

== Career ==
After graduating from the University of Manitoba, Yvonne began working on research regarding the performance characteristics of propellants at Douglas Aircraft in the United States. She mentions the shortage of technical graduates due to the United States conscription as a reason she was offered multiple positions despite her lack of an engineering degree. Her main interest was in engineering, but she started as a mathematician in the Research Department and later transferred to Douglas’ Aerodynamics Department. There were very few women with which Brill worked, she was believed to be the only female rocket scientist at the time. At this time, she also began pursuing further education, and through late night classes she erned a Master's Degree in Chemistry from the University of Southern California in 1951.

After, she began working on Project RAND where she became a Research Analyst in the Missiles Division and participated in studies regarding rocket propellant performance and further derived thermodynamic properties for rocket exhaust gas, which provided the world with its first industry standards.

Afterwards, she accepted a position at Marquardt Corporation before the beginning of her career at RCA Astro Electronics where she made her most notable innovation: Electrothermal Hydrazine Thruster (EHT/Resistojet) for which she holds a US Patent (No. 3,807,657). She invented the Hydrazine Electro Thermal Thruster while working on the NOVA spacecraft which were used in the Apollo moon missions. The Electrothermal Hydrazine Thruster electrically heats hydrazine rocket fuel and reduces the amount of rocket fuel necessary to keep a satellite in successful orbit without straying off course due to external gravitational forces. Yvonne's invention improved overall satellite efficiency by thirty percent (30%) which allows spacecraft to carry significantly more equipment, which therefore helps satellites stay in orbit for longer periods of time, supplying mankind with more data than previously possible. Additionally, the simplicity of her design increased reliability as there were less parts at risk to malfunction. Because of this reason her invention resulted in a single propellant rather than multiple. Over time, this invention became an industry standard as well, and drastically increased revenue for owners of commercial communication satellites. Large aeronautics and aviation companies including, but not limited to, RCA, GE, Lockheed Martin, and Orbital Sciences have used the EHT in their communication satellites.

Brill also contributed to the propulsion systems of TIROS, the first weather satellite; Nova, a series of rocket designs that were used in American Moon missions; Explorer 32, the first upper-atmosphere satellite; and the Mars Observer, which in 1992 almost entered a Mars orbit before losing communication with Earth.

Later, Yvone Brill parted ways with the RCA and began working as a director of the Space Shuttle Solid Rocket Program at NASA. However, two years after, in 1983, Yvonne returned to the RCA and remained there for three years in a position at the International Maritime Satellite Organization working as a space segment engineer in London, England. At this time, she also participated in many National Research Council Study committees as well as the NASA Aerospace Safety Advisory Panel from 1994 until 2001. At the same time she worked and consulted with many aerospace working groups from the Navy, Army, and Department of Defense, as well as consulting with foreign governments to improve their communication satellite presence in space.

After retiring in 1991, Yvonne devoted a significant amount of her time to professional organizations such as the AIAA (American Institute of Astronautics and Aeronautics) and SWE (Society of Women Engineers). She became an advocate for women in engineering and became a mentor for women at all career levels. After she was recognized with the SWE's achievement award in 1986, she devoted a majority of the remainder of her successful life to nominating other women for awards which could improve their professional careers and help recognize their scientific achievements.

== Awards and honors ==
Brill was the recipient of many prestigious awards. She founded scholarships and a lectureship.

- The NASA Distinguished Public Service Medal (2001). This is the highest honor that NASA awards to non-government employees who demonstrate a level of excellence that has made a profound impact to NASA mission success.
- The AIAA Wyld Propulsion Award (2002) This award is given annually to honor outstanding achievements in the development or application or rocket propulsion systems. She was presented the award considering her innovations in electric on-orbit propulsion systems.
- The American Association of Engineering Societies John Fritz Medal (2009). This medal is described as the Nobel prize of engineering, or the highest award within the profession.
- The Harper's Bazaar and the DeBeers Corporation Diamond Superwoman Award (1980). Given to her for returning to a successful career after starting a family.
- In 2010, President Barack Obama bestowed her with the National Medal of Technology and Innovation.^{[2]} The medal is given to America’s leading innovators who have made outstanding contributions to the development of new and important technology that support America’s economic, environmental, and social well-being.
- The National Inventors Hall of Fame (2010)
- A lunar crater within the de Gerlache formation was named after her in 2023.

Brill was elected to the National Academy of Engineering (1987). She was also named fellow of The Society of Women Engineers (SWE) in 1985 and received its highest honor, the Achievement Award, the following year.

The Yvonne C. Brill Lectureship of the American Institute of Aeronautics and Astronautics is named in her honor and presented annually. She spent the last twenty years of her life promoting women in science and engineering.

== Personal life ==
While completing her Master's degree, she met her husband, William Brill, a post doctoral fellow at the University of California, Los Angeles. The two were married within a year, and they soon moved East for William’s job at FMC Corporation. The couple would move wherever work took him, and Yvonne later began working part-time and consulting jobs so that she could care for their two sons, Matthew and Joseph, and a daughter, Naomi.

At age 88, Yvonne Brill died of complications of breast cancer in Princeton, New Jersey.

An obituary of Brill published in the March 30, 2013, issue of the New York Times drew much news coverage not necessarily because of her remarkable accomplishments in the field of rocket science, but due to apparent sexism. It originally began: "She made a mean beef stroganoff, followed her husband from job to job and took eight years off from work to raise three children". Only several paragraphs later would you be able to find out that she was actually working part-time while raising her children, and then returning to full-time employment that lead to her fame for her research and innovations. The obituary was heavily criticized for leading with and overemphasizing Brill's gender and family life, rather than her remarkable scientific and career achievements and was cited as an example of an article that failed the Finkbeiner test. The Times later dropped the reference to her cooking and changed the lead of the article.

== See also ==
- Timeline of women in science
- Busch-Vishniac, Ilene; Busch, Lauren; Tietjen, Jill (2024). "Chapter 25. Yvonne Brill". Women in the National Inventors Hall of Fame: The First 50 Years. Springer Nature. ISBN 9783031755255.
