= Chain of Attack =

1987 novel by Gene DeWeese

- Cover
- Author: Gene DeWeese
- Language: English
- Genre: Science fiction
- Publisher: Pocket Books
- Publication date: 1 February 1987
- Publication place: United States
- Media type: Print (paperback)
- Pages: 251 pp
- ISBN: 0-671-66658-4 (first edition, paperback)
- OCLC: 34964354
- Preceded by: Battlestations!
- Followed by: Deep Domain

Chain of Attack is a 1987 Star Trek: The Original Series novel written by Gene DeWeese.

== Plot ==
While mapping gravitational anomalies, the USS Enterprise is hurled millions of light-years off course. They find themselves in a galaxy devastated by war and soon they are under attack by both warring fleets. Captain Kirk risks his ship and crew in order to stop the war and get home.

== Reception ==
Chain of Attack reached 12 on the New York Times bestseller list on February 22, 1987.

== Film adaptation ==
The novel has been adapted into a fan-made film, Star Trek: Infinite Chain, which can be viewed on YouTube.
