= Christie Aschwanden =

American journalist

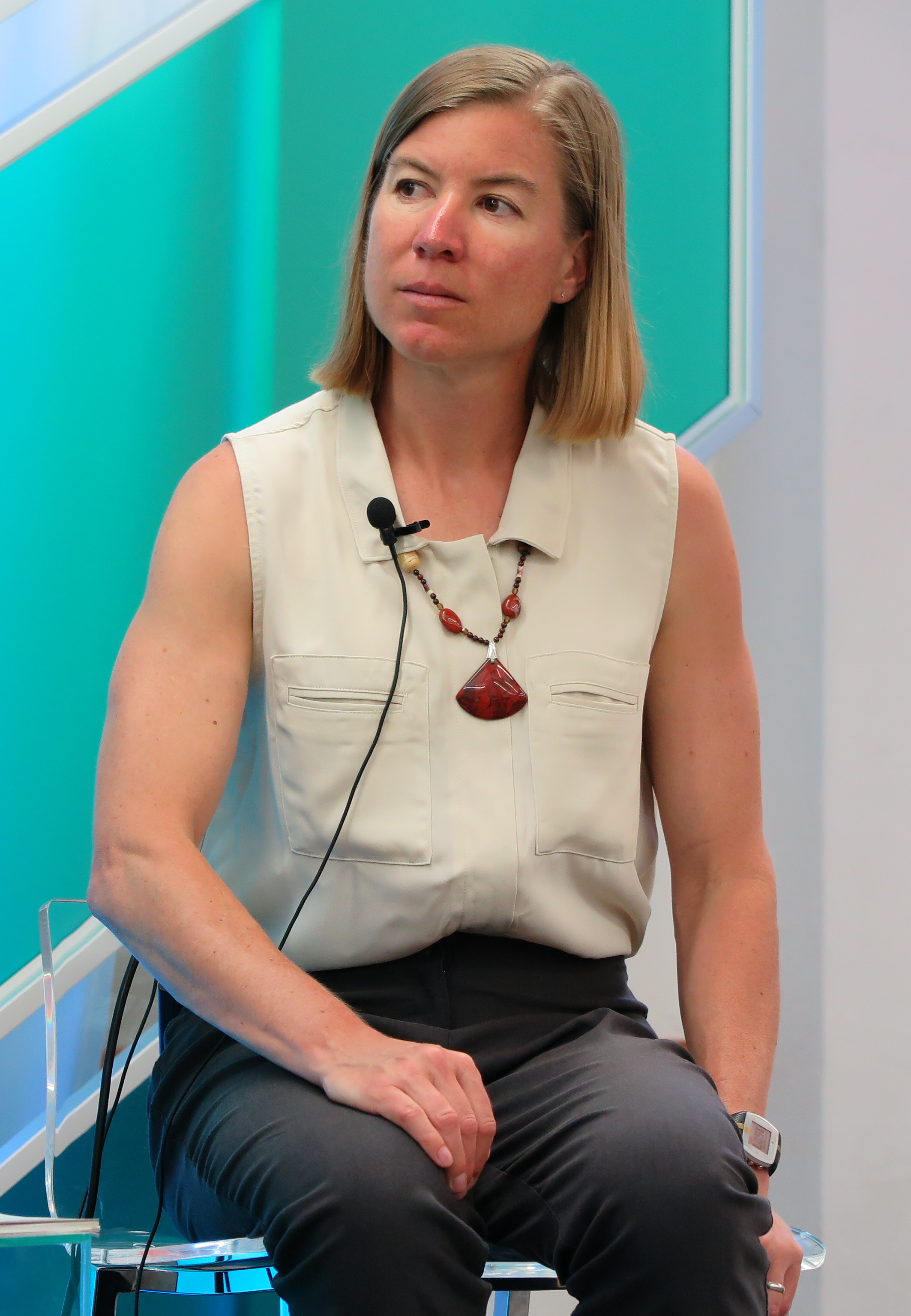
- Education: University of Colorado Boulder; University of California, Santa Cruz
- Awards: AAAS Kavli Science Journalism Award

Christie Aschwanden is an American journalist and the former lead science writer at FiveThirtyEight. Her 2019 book GOOD TO GO: What the Athlete in All of Us Can Learn From the Strange Science of Recovery, was a New York Times bestseller. She was awarded an American Association for the Advancement of Science Kavli Science Journalism Award in 2016 and serves on the board of the Council for the Advancement of Science Writing.

== Early life and education ==
Aschwanden is the daughter of a United States Air Force fighter pilot. She was a high school track star. Aschwanden studied biology at the University of Colorado Boulder, where, alongside her studies, she was a professional cyclist. During her summers she interned at ScienceNOW, the web news service of the journal Science. After graduating she worked as a research assistant in a laboratory in Boulder. Whilst she briefly considered applying for a doctorate, she did not want to specialize. During her time as a researcher Aschwanden discovered the popular-science magazine New Scientist and decided that she would like to be a science journalist. She attended a science writing workshop in Santa Fe in 1996. She eventually studied science communication at University of California, Santa Cruz and graduated in 1998.

== Career ==
Aschwanden is interested in the research process, and spent 2015 investigating whether science was “broken”. Her investigations considered scientific misconduct and fraud, and found that whilst these cases made headlines, they were a "mere distraction" from science itself. She has studied P-hacking, a method that involves narrowing or expanding data sets to prove a particular hypothesis. Scientific results are influenced by the analytical decisions of researchers, and whilst they are usually in "good faith", they can bias the way evidence is interpreted. She went on to show that the science of nutrition wasn't clean-cut; owing to difficulties in relying on self-reported diets, and how the act of self-reporting changes how one chooses food. During her investigations Aschwanden demonstrated that, to a certain p-value, eating shellfish was linked to being right handed and that eating cabbage was linked to having an innie bellybutton. Her reporting was the first to reveal the statistical and reproducibility issues in sports science, in particularly, concerns over magnitude-based inference (MBI). MBI is a statistical method that was developed by a group of Australian sport scientists. It has received widespread criticism for not being robust – the sample sizes are too small and the conclusions are not backed up by enough evidence.

In 2013, Aschwanden proposed the Finkbeiner test, a checklist to end gender bias in journalism.

GOOD TO GO: What the Athlete in All of Us Can Learn From the Strange Science of Recovery, Aschwanden's first book, explored the science of exercise recovery. It looks at the tools that have been developed to optimize recovery, including nutrition, mental health and inflammation. The book made the New York Times Sports & Fitness best sellers list.

She spent 2013 as a Carter Center Fellow, and 2014 as a Santa Fe Institute Journalism Fellow. In 2019 Aschwanden was the science writer in residence at the University of Wisconsin–Madison where she spoke about the use and abuse of scientific evidence. Aschwanden produces the podcast Emerging Form, which discusses the creative process. She has spoken at the Aspen Ideas Festival. Her writing has appeared in Runner's World, The New York Times, The Washington Post and New Scientist. She serves on the board of the Council for the Advancement of Science Writing, and was formerly the lead science writer for FiveThirtyEight. She has said that she liked working at FiveThirtyEight because she could create exciting infographics.

=== Awards and honors ===
- 2005 American Society of Journalists and Authors Best Article
- 2007 American Society of Journalists and Authors Outstanding Essay
- 2007 American Institute of Biological Sciences Honourable mention for print journalism
- 2013 National Association of Science Writers Science in Society Award
- 2015 Society of Professional Journalists Sigma Delta Chi Award for Public Service in Magazine Journalism
- 2015 American Association for the Advancement of Science Kavli Science Journalism Award
- 2016 American Association for the Advancement of Science Silver Award
- 2016 Information is Beautiful Award

=== Selected publications ===
- Aschwanden, Christie (2019). Beautiful Chickens: Portraits of Champion Breeds. Ivy Press. ISBN 978-1782407614.
- Aschwanden, Christie (2019). Good to Go: How to Eat, Sleep and Rest Like a Champion. Pan Macmillan. ISBN 978-1509827657.

== Personal life ==
Aschwanden is an endurance athlete. She has been involved in athletics, cycling and skiing. She raced professionally as a member of the Team Rossignol Nordic skiing squad. She is married and lives with her husband, Dave Aschwanden, and numerous animals in western Colorado on a small winery. The winery produces Chill Switch Wines.
