= Smurfette principle =

Having only one female character in an ensemble

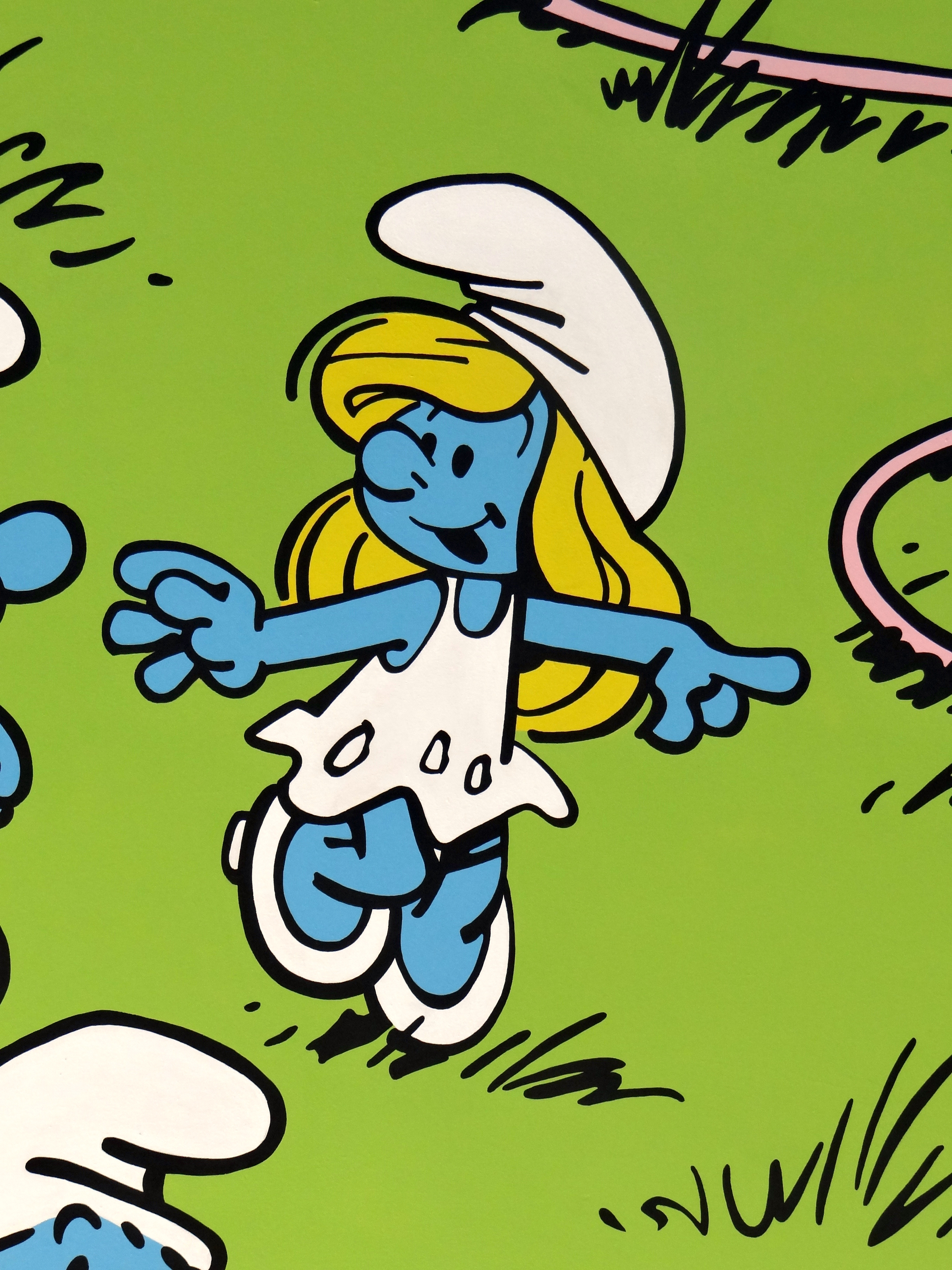
There are many male main characters in The Smurfs, but few female ones, including Smurfette.

The Smurfette principle is the practice in media, such as film and television, to include only one woman in an otherwise entirely male ensemble. It establishes a male-dominated narrative, where the woman is the exception and exists only in reference to the men. The concept is named after Smurfette, the only woman among the Smurfs, a group of comic book creatures.

== Description by Katha Pollitt ==
The term was coined by Katha Pollitt in 1991 in The New York Times:

Contemporary shows are either essentially all-male, like "Garfield", or are organized on what I call the Smurfette principle: a group of male buddies will be accented by a lone female, stereotypically defined (...) The message is clear. Boys are the norm, girls the variation; boys are central, girls peripheral; boys are individuals, girls types. Boys define the group, its story and its code of values. Girls exist only in relation to boys.

Pollitt observed this as what she thought of in terms of a common media practice while shopping for her daughter's Christmas toys. The initial use of the term was in relation to "preschool culture", that to Pollitt, would hinder a child's understanding of gender. She wrote: "The sexism in preschool culture deforms both boys and girls. Little girls learn to split their consciousness, filtering their dreams and ambitions through boy characters while admiring the clothes of the princess."

The female character essentially represents "femininity" in these cases. She may or may not play a major role in the story, but typically is "everything female". Some examples that Pollitt cites include the mother figure, a “glamour queen,” or a female sidekick of sorts.

== Observations ==
In 2011, Pollitt discussed her term again in The Atlantic. She said that the issue is still highly prevalent in the current media. She specifically cited the feature film, Super 8 (2011), which had only one female main character (played by Elle Fanning). Also at this time, she extended the principle to include television networks. The only major female anchor in the MSNBC lineup in 2011, according to Pollitt, was Rachel Maddow. She commented, "It's quite remarkable that there's only this one woman, and it's never equal."

This phenomenon has not disappeared by any means, making many appearances in popular literature and discourse. Journalists complain that major blockbusters often include only one female, and this trend is not fading anytime soon. This is visible in ensemble movie posters, like with Ocean's Eleven, The Matrix, and Star Wars, among many others. New York Magazine compiled all lines spoken by women in the original Star Wars trilogy other than Princess Leia, which constitute a mere 63 seconds of dialogue during the total series run time of nearly seven hours (23,160 seconds). Steve Rose looks at Eleven's situation in the TV show Stranger Things, where she is essentially replaced (while on her own adventures) by Max, another young girl, who is also teased, then "lusted after", another common reaction to a lone female character. The "Smurfette", or sole female cast member, has been understood to typically have a stereotypical role of a romantic partner, a “brooding badass,” or exists to deflate the tension of an all-male cast.

As a result of the discontent about the lack of women, a new pattern has emerged, of “gender-inversion,” resulting in versions of existing media franchises with lead casts of exclusively female actresses, like Ocean's 8 and Ghostbusters.

The Geena Davis Institute on Gender in Media found that only “10% of all films have a gender balanced cast,” thus reinforcing the existence of the lack of fair female representation, i.e. the Smurfette Principle.

In an article and video for Bitch Magazine, Anita Sarkeesian asserts that the tendency of media from the 1980s and 1990s—which typically adhere to this principle—continuously being remade results in the recurrence of this issue, creating an ongoing cycle. She also called on the film industry to include more female characters, or even a female-dominated cast, and pass the Bechdel test, stating that after these are kept in mind and actually accomplished, meaningful diversity will be possible.

== Uses in scholarship ==
Rickie Solinger, in a review of some of Pollitt's major works up to 1993, wrote that the Smurfette principle applies to preschoolers and adults alike.

Jan Susina, a scholar and researcher of child and adolescent literature, used the term in a 1995 edition of the journal, The Lion and the Unicorn, to back up his assertion that children's literature is being “dumbed down” as a larger symptom of cultural problems, particularly that entertainment is like “junk food,” or unrewarding to the audience. He uses Pollitt's term as evidence that a lack of women contributes to low quality media for children and also that the popular media has picked up on this issue in major publications.

== Examples ==
The principle has been observed in the following works among others:

- Smurfette
- Dolly for Sue in the Island of Misfit Toys sequence in Rudolph the Red-Nosed Reindeer
- Miss Piggy in Jim Henson's The Muppets
- Lanolin from U.S. Acres
- Dot Warner from The Warner Trio in Animaniacs
- Kimiko Miyashiro from The Boys
- Princess Leia in Star Wars
- Penny in The Big Bang Theory (seasons 1–3)
- Elaine Benes in Seinfeld
- Kanga in Winnie the Pooh
- April O'Neil in Teenage Mutant Ninja Turtles
- Eleven in Stranger Things (season 1)
- Wonder Woman in the DC Extended Universe
- Black Widow in the Marvel Cinematic Universe
- Beverly Marsh in It.

== See also ==
- Bechdel test
- Damsel in distress
- Manic Pixie Dream Girl
- Mary Sue
- Reverse harem
- Tokenism
