= Camille Bacon-Smith =

American scholar and novelist

Camille Bacon-Smith is an American scholar and novelist. She has a Ph.D. in folklore and folklife from the University of Pennsylvania. Her books, Enterprising Women (1992) and Science Fiction Culture (1999), investigated science fiction fandom, including such aspects as slash fiction, hurt-comfort stories and Mary Sue characterization. Under her own name she has published an urban fantasy series beginning with Eye of the Daemon (1996). Under the pen name Curt Benjamin, she has written fantasy novels with an Asian setting, beginning with The Prince of Shadow (2001). In 2016 she began writing dance reviews for Broad Street Review, an online publication on Philadelphia arts and culture.

== Scholarship ==
The book Enterprising Women: Television Fandom and the Creation of Popular Myth (1992) is a study of the largely female fiction-writing fandom community of Star Trek and other genre television series. In a review for the Journal of Communication, Stephen Duncombe praised the book for the thick descriptions that allow the reader to vicariously experience conventions, fanzines and weekend retreats watching videos. He took issue, however, with Bacon-Smith's theory that hurt-comfort stories are the "heart" of fan culture, suggesting that this downplays the diversity of motives underlying fan involvement. Ultimately the objections are classified as minor and the review concludes with an evocation of the title sequence of Star Trek:

Bacon-Smith has brought to life and analyzed a culture most are not aware exists. She has done it carefully, with a sophisticated battery of ethnographic methods, and with respect for the people she is studying. In the words of the opening monologue of the "Star Trek" series, she has succeeded in her "mission to seek out new life and new civilizations." And she has shown us that these new worlds can be found in our own backyard.

In a review for H-Net Reviews, Anne Collins Smith likewise objected to the focus on hurt-comfort stories, arguing that they are "neither common to fandom nor unique to fandom". She praised Bacon-Smith, however, for her analysis of the Mary Sue phenomenon and for disproving the theories of earlier scholars on women's enjoyment of homoerotic fiction. She called Enterprising Women "a landmark work". The book was nominated for the Hugo Award for Best Related Work in 1993.

In another book, Science Fiction Culture (1999), Bacon-Smith investigated the complex relationship between consumers and producers of science fiction. The study describes the evolution of the fan community to include cyberpunk youth culture as well as gay, lesbian and feminist fans. In a review in Media, Culture & Society, Vincent Campbell praised the book for useful details on the active role of the fan community in production of texts in the genre but criticized it for too heavily engaging in description at the cost of analysis. In a review in Extrapolation, Dirk Remly noted some imbalance between the three sections of the book but praised it as "an outstanding guide to the historical, social, and political dynamics of the science fiction literary marketplace". Steven H Silver praised the book for giving "a great deal of insight into the reasons people join fandom" and for leaving "roadsigns pointing in a wide variety of directions which can, and should, be further studied."

== Novels as Camille Bacon-Smith ==
Bacon-Smith has published urban fantasy novels under her own name. The first were The Face of Time (1996) and a series beginning with Eye of the Daemon (1996), which Dragon Magazine criticized for "unsuccessful plotting and self-referential characterization." The second novel in the series, Eyes of the Empress (1998), was praised in Science Fiction Chronicle which stated that "Bacon-Smith improves with each book, and is evolving toward a leading role in the modern fantasy field." Library Journal described the book as "lushly textured and intricately constructed". A third installment, A Legacy of Daemons (2010), was published after a long hiatus.

== Novels as Curt Benjamin ==
Bacon-Smith has published four novels of Asian-themed fantasy under the pen name Curt Benjamin. The first was The Prince of Shadow (2001) which Booklist described as "vivid and engrossing" and Starlog as "a thoroughly enjoyable read". Publishers Weekly was less positive, criticizing "a somewhat plodding style" and "superficial characterization" but praising "the vivid fantasy elements".

The next book, The Prince of Dreams (2002), garnered positive reviews with Publishers Weekly calling it a "rousing fantasy adventure" while Library Journal praised its cast of characters. Starlog called the novel "quirky and delightful fantasy" and Booklist praised the subtleties of nonverbal communication among the characters. The third novel, The Gates of Heaven (2003), garnered less positive attention and Starlog stated it "isn't quite as good as its predecessors", nevertheless praising the conclusion as satisfying.

The fourth book in the same setting, Lords of Grass and Thunder (2005), was described as "[y]et another exquisite, page-turning adventure" (Booklist) with an "intense, dramatic plot" (Starlog). Publishers Weekly called it a "well-told fantasy" but noted that "intrigues and tussles for the throne go on a tad too long" SFRevu noted that the prose tended towards verbosity but praised the novel for engaging characters and humor. Science Fiction Chronicle described the plot as "standard" but praised the "very inventive and original background material".

== Other professional activities ==
In the late 1990s, Bacon-Smith was an English professor at Temple University. In the early 2000s, she was editor of New Directions in Folklore, an online journal.
