= Manic Pixie Dream Girl =

Female stock character who acts as a love interest

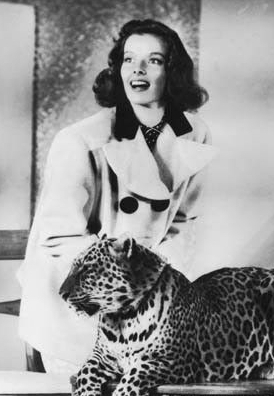
Katharine Hepburn's role as Susan Vance in the 1938 screwball comedy film Bringing Up Baby has been described as an early example of the character.

A Manic Pixie Dream Girl (MPDG) is a stock character in fiction: a young woman with eccentric personality quirks who serves as the romantic interest for an everyman protagonist. The term was coined in 2007 by the American film critic Nathan Rabin after observing Kirsten Dunst's character in Elizabethtown (2005). Rabin criticized the type as one-dimensional, existing only to provide emotional support to the protagonist, or to teach him important life lessons, while receiving nothing in return. The term has since entered the general vernacular.

== Origin ==
The American film critic Nathan Rabin coined the term in 2007 in his review of the 2005 film Elizabethtown for The A.V. Club. In discussing Kirsten Dunst's character, he said "Dunst embodies a character type I like to call The Manic Pixie Dream Girl", a character who "exists solely in the fevered imaginations of sensitive writer-directors to teach broodingly soulful young men to embrace life and its infinite mysteries and adventures." Rabin also names Natalie Portman's character in Garden State as another prime example of the MPDG.

== Occurrence ==
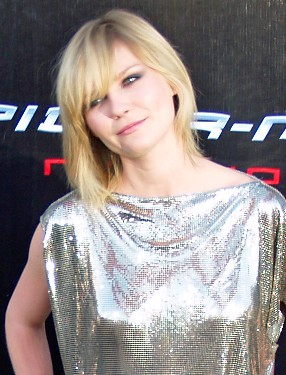
Kirsten Dunst (pictured in 2007), whose character in Elizabethtown inspired the term MPDG

In 2008, a year after Rabin coined the term, The A.V. Club ran a piece listing 16 characters they deemed MPDGs, which included Katharine Hepburn's character in Bringing Up Baby (1938) as one of the earliest examples of the archetype. Others in the list included Goldie Hawn's character, Jill, in Butterflies Are Free; and Winona Ryder's character in Autumn in New York. The new term was used by media outlets such as National Public Radio and Jezebel.

Critic Jimmy Maher of The Digital Antiquarian wrote about the character Clarisse in the 1953 Ray Bradbury novel Fahrenheit 451: "Bradbury has been credited, with some truth, with foreshadowing or even inspiring everything from 24-hour news as entertainment to the Sony Walkman in Fahrenheit 451. I've never, however, seen him properly credited for his most insidious creation: the Manic Pixie Dream Girl." Holly Golightly in Breakfast at Tiffany's, played by Audrey Hepburn in the 1961 film, is an example of a vintage Manic Pixie Dream Girl, according to Grace Smith, writing for The Hollywood Insider: "The effortlessly eccentric Holly Golightly balances out the brooding writer Paul Varjack." Penélope Cruz's character in the movie Vanilla Sky (2001) is included on Jamie Loftus' list of MPDGs, published by BDCWire. Margot Robbie's character in Amsterdam (2022) is characterized by Christy Lemire writing for RogerEbert.com as a Manic Pixie Dream Girl. Riley Keough's titular character in Daisy Jones & The Six (2023) has been described by Caroline Kraft of The New Yorker as akin to the MPDG: "A sexually liberated woman, she exists as a foil to male responsibility: she'll teach Billy the value of an unfettered approach while also instructing him in the risks of his own desires. He is drawn to her because she helps him understand himself. She is the caretaker of his catharsis and little else".

The trope inspired the name of Manic Dream Pixie, the 2023 debut EP by Australian singer-songwriter Peach PRC.

== Response ==
In an interview in New York about her 2012 film Ruby Sparks, actress and screenwriter Zoe Kazan expressed skepticism over the use of the term, noting that its use could be reductive, diminutive, and misogynistic. She disagreed that Hepburn's character in Bringing Up Baby is a MPDG: "I think that to lump together all individual, original quirky women under that rubric is to erase all difference."

In a December 2012 video, AllMovie critic Cammila Collar embraced the term, noting that its pejorative use is mainly directed at writers who do not give these female characters more to do.

In December 2012, Slate's Aisha Harris posited that "critiques of the MPDG may have become more common than the archetype itself", suggesting that filmmakers had been forced to become "self-aware about such characters" and that the trope had largely disappeared from film.

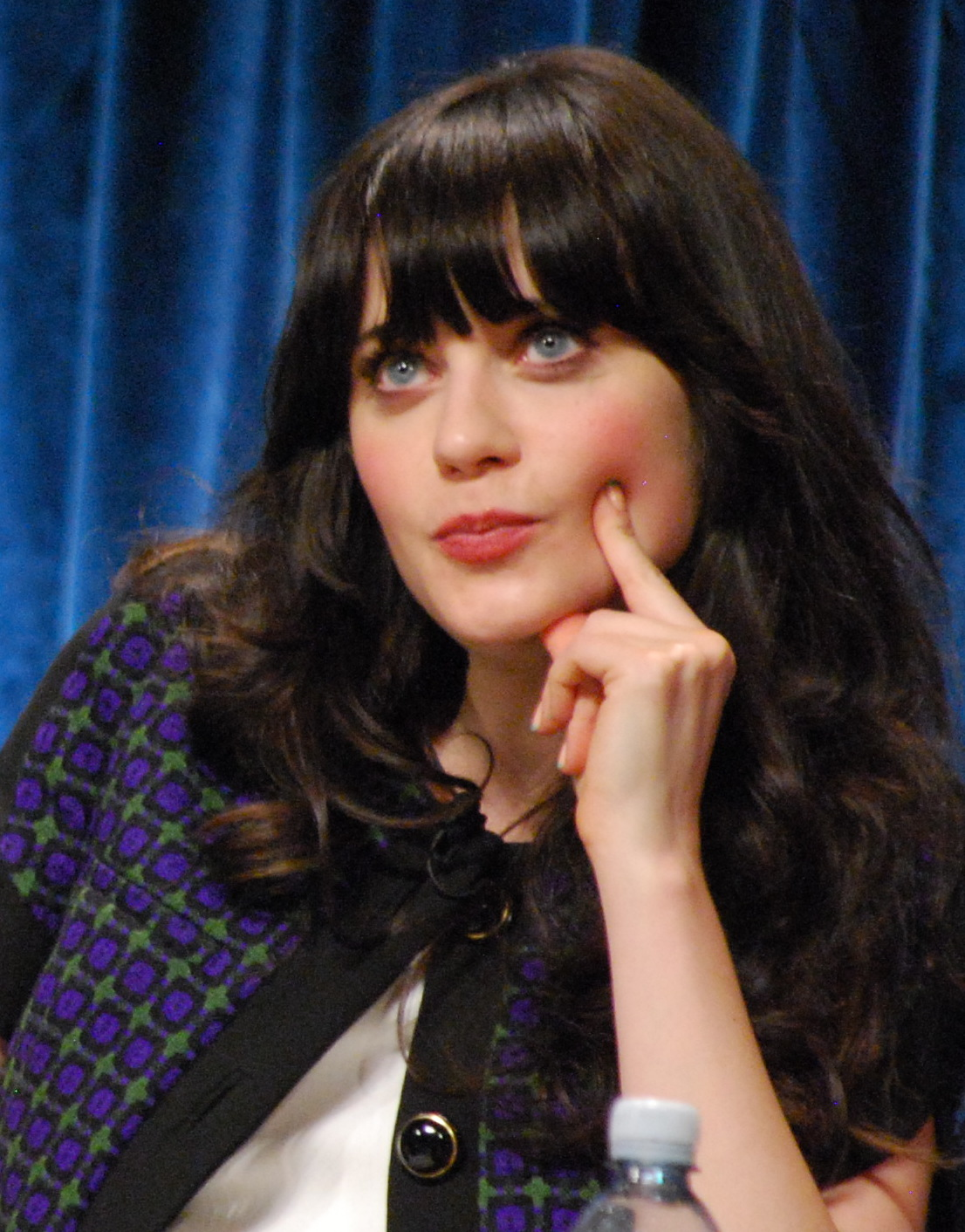
Actress Zooey Deschanel (pictured in 2012) has criticized her frequent characterization as a MPDG

Similar sentiments were expressed by Monika Bartyzel for The Week in April 2013, who wrote "this once-useful piece of critical shorthand has devolved into laziness and sexism". Bartyzel argues that "'Manic Pixie Dream Girl' was useful when it commented on the superficiality of female characterizations in male-dominated journeys, but it has since devolved into a pejorative way to deride unique women in fiction and reality".

In July 2014, writing for Salon, Rabin stated that the term "Manic Pixie Dream Girl" had frequently been deployed in ways that are sexist and had become as much of a cliché as the trope itself. Rabin acknowledged that the phrase has its uses in specific, limited contexts, but overwhelming popularity had limited its effectiveness. Rabin concluded by saying that the term should be "put to rest".

In 2022, actress Zooey Deschanel rejected the label's application to her, saying "I don't feel it's accurate. I'm not a girl. I'm a woman. It doesn't hurt my feelings, but it's a way of making a woman one-dimensional and I'm not one-dimensional." According to Variety, the label had followed her throughout her career since her appearance in 500 Days of Summer.

In 2025, Róisín Lanigan, writing for The Observer, contrasted the Manic Pixie Dream Girl with newer female archetypes, stating "the coquettish archetype of millennial movies might have been reductive but the e-girls and trad wives that followed are even more oppressed."

== Male variation ==
A male version of this trope, the Manic Pixie Dream Boy or Manic Pixie Dream Guy, was found in Augustus Waters from the film version of The Fault in Our Stars (2014); he was given this title in a 2014 Vulture article, in which Matt Patches stated, "he's a bad boy, he's a sweetheart, he's a dumb jock, he's a nerd, he's a philosopher, he's a poet, he's a victim, he's a survivor, he's everything everyone wants in their lives, and he's a fallacious notion of what we can actually have in our lives."

The Manic Pixie Dream Boy trope has also been pointed out in sitcoms such as Parks and Recreation and 30 Rock. The female protagonists of these shows marry men (Adam Scott's Ben Wyatt and James Marsden's Criss Chros, respectively), who, according to a 2012 Grantland article, "patiently [tamp] down her stubbornness and temper while appreciating her quirks, helping her to become her best possible self."

== See also ==
- Bechdel test
- Damsel in distress
- Foil (fiction)
- Gamine
- Johanson analysis
- Magical Negro
- Mary Sue
- Smurfette principle
