= Sarah Dunant =

British writer, broadcaster and critic (born 1950)

Sarah Dunant FRSL
- Born: 8 August 1950 (age 76); London, England
- Education: Godolphin and Latymer School; Newnham College, Cambridge
- Occupations: Writer, broadcaster, critic
- Writing career
- Notable work: Fatlands (1993)
- Notable awards: Silver Dagger Award for Crime Fiction
- Website: www.sarahdunant.com

Sarah Dunant (born 8 August 1950) is a British novelist, journalist, broadcaster, and critic.

== Early life ==
Dunant was born in 1950 and raised in London. She is the daughter of David Dunant, a former Welsh airline steward who later became a manager at British Airways, and his French wife Estelle, who grew up in Bangalore, India.

She went to Godolphin and Latymer, a local girls' grammar school. She then studied history at Newnham College, Cambridge, where she was involved in the amateur theatrical club Footlights. After she graduated, she earned an actor's equity card and moved to Tokyo, Japan. In Tokyo, she worked as an English teacher and nightclub hostess for six months, before returning home through Southeast Asia.

== Broadcasting career ==
She worked at BBC Radio 4 for two years in London, producing its then arts magazine programme Kaleidoscope, before travelling again, this time overland through North, Central and South America, a trip that became research material for her first solo novel Snow Storms in a Hot Climate (1988), a thriller about the early cocaine trade in Colombia.

She went on to work extensively in radio and television, most notably as a presenter of BBC2's late-night live arts programme The Late Show in the 1990s and Night Waves, BBC Radio 3's nightly cultural discussion programme.

She contributes regularly to radio, as an occasional presenter for BBC Radio 4's opinion slot A Point of View. and more recently delivering a series of five original essays on Isabella d'Este and the art of writing historical fiction, entitled Unearthing the Past.

== Writing ==
Dunant started writing in her late twenties, first with a friend, with whom she produced two political thrillers and a five-part BBC1 drama series – Thin Air, starring Kate Hardie, Nicky Henson and Clive Merrison, broadcast in 1988 – before going solo with her thriller Snow Storms in a Hot Climate.

Her subsequent novels have explored two genres: contemporary thrillers and historical fiction. What unites the two is her decision to use avowedly popular forms, characterised by compelling storytelling, as a way to explore accurate history and serious subject matter to reach a large audience. This has included (though not exclusively) a passionate commitment to feminism and the role of women inside history.

In the 1990s, she wrote a trilogy around a British female private eye called Hannah Wolfe, spotlighting issues such as surrogacy, cosmetic surgery, animal rights, and violence to women. Sexual violence was also at the centre of Transgressions (based on a mysterious series of incidents happening in her house, which tackled what might happen if a woman woke to an intruder in her house and lived to tell the tale. The resulting furore over the actions of the heroine "caused the book to become a cause celebre which triggered a debate about rape and popular culture".

In 2000, an extended visit to Florence, Italy, changed Dunant's working life. In what she acknowledged was something of a midlife crisis, her old passion for history was reignited, and she started to research the impact of the Renaissance on the city in the 1490s. The result was The Birth of Venus, the first of a trilogy of novels about women's lives in the Italian Renaissance. The commercial success of these books in America and elsewhere allowed Dunant to devote herself full-time to writing and research, concentrating on the most current work being done in Renaissance studies, most particularly concerning the lives of women. The novel Sacred Hearts, a story of nuns in an enclosed convent in 16th-century Ferrara, led to collaboration with the early music group Musica Secreta: a theatrical adaptation using the music of the period and with a choir, performed in churches and at early music festivals around Britain.

Since then, she has worked on the history of the Borgia family, seeking to separate the colourful historical truth from the smear and gossip that built up during their lives, and in history after their deaths. It has made her an advocate for better historical accuracy in popular television series such as The Borgias.

Her most recent book The Marchesa centres on the life of Isabella d'Este, the first female art collector and patron of the Italian Renaissance. She left behind her an archive of 33,000 letters of correspondence. She rubbed shoulders with popes, kings and bankers, artists like Leonardo, Mantegna, and Titian, was a diplomat running the state while her husband was away fighting, and was an icon of fashion and style.

As a journalist, Dunant has reviewed for many UK newspapers, as well as for The New York Times, and edited two books of essays on political correctness (The War of the Words, 1995) and millennial anxieties (The Age of Anxiety, 1996, with Roy Porter). She works regularly in Radio and print.

== Awards/citations ==
Dunant's crime novels were three times shortlisted for the CWA Gold Dagger award, and in 1994 she won a Silver Dagger for Fatlands.

In 2010, Sacred Hearts was shortlisted for the first Walter Scott Prize for Historical Fiction, an award that highlighted the growing power and popularity of the form.

She is an accredited lecturer for NADFAS, the UK arts charity that promotes education and appreciation of fine arts.

In 2016, she was awarded an honorary doctorate of letters from Oxford Brookes University, where she is a guest lecturer on the Creative writing M.A. course.

Dunant was elected a Fellow of the Royal Society of Literature in 2024.

== Views ==
In her journalism and public speaking, Dunant is among other things, a feminist, and an advocate for legalisation of marijuana. A Catholic by birth, she has also written about the role and importance of religion in history and the need for Catholicism to reform itself.

== Bibliography ==
=== Mystery ===
==== Marla Masterson (co-written with Peter Busby as Peter Dunant) ====
1. Exterminating Angels, 1983. London: David & Charles. ISBN 9780233975900
2. Intensive Care, 1986. London: Andre Deutsch. ISBN 978-0233978208

==== Hannah Wolfe ====
1. Birth Marks, 1992. New York: Doubleday. ISBN 978-0385423182
2. Fatlands, 1993. New York: Penzler Books. ISBN 978-1883402822
3. Under My Skin, 1995. New York: Scribner Book Co. ISBN 978-0684815213

==== Standalone ====
- Snow Storms in a Hot Climate, 1988. New York: Random House. ISBN 978-0394570181
- Transgressions, 1997. New York: HarperCollins. ISBN 978-0060392482
- Mapping the Edge, 1999. New York: Random House. ISBN 978-0-375-50323-8

=== Historical novels of the Italian Renaissance ===
==== The Borgias ====
1. Blood and Beauty, 2013. London: Virago Press. ISBN 978-1844087426
2. In the Name of the Family, 2017. London: Virago Press. ISBN 978-1844087464

==== Standalone ====
- The Birth of Venus, 2003. New York: Random House.ISBN 978-1400060733
- In the Company of the Courtesan, 2006. London: Virago Press. ISBN 978-1844080106
- Sacred Hearts, 2009. New York: Random House. ISBN 978-1400063826
- The Marchesa 2025. Whitefox, ISBN 978-1-9177523-08-0 an illustrated novel on the life, letters and times of Isabella d'Este, Marchesa of Mantua

=== Non-Fiction ===
- The War of the Words: The Political Correctness Debate, 1995. London: Virago Press. ISBN 978-1853818349
- The Age of Anxiety (with Roy Porter), 1996. London: Virago Press. ISBN 978-1860492136

== Awards ==
- 1993: Silver Dagger Award (from Crime Writers' Association), winner, Fatlands
- 2010: Walter Scott Prize for Historical Fiction, shortlist, Sacred Hearts
