= Jodi Taylor =

English novelist

Jodi Taylor is an English author of fantasy-style historical fiction, historical romance and romance novels.

== Early life, family and education ==
Jodi Taylor was born in Bristol, England. With her then-husband, Taylor moved to Yorkshire.

== Career ==
She worked for North Yorkshire County Council for almost 20 years, in positions including library facilities manager.

=== As author ===
Taylor's first book, Just One Damned Thing After Another, was self-published on two download websites. That manuscript was subsequently purchased by Accent Press, which published all her subsequent works, up to December 2018. Headline Publishing Group became responsible for publishing her works as of January 2019.

== Reception ==
Just One Damned Thing After Another appeared on the USA Today Best-Selling Books list on 21 January 2016 at #74. It earned a starred review from Publishers Weekly, which called it "a carnival ride" in a "world ... depicted in lush detail". The review in Library Journal lauded the book's "appealing cast of characters", with "plenty of humor, lots of action, and even a touch of romance".

The first fan convention, Jodiworld, was held in Coventry, UK, in June 2023. Taylor and her literary agent (and former publisher), Hazel Cushion, were in attendance, with Jasper Fforde as an additional guest of honour.

== Personal life ==
As of 2024, Jodi Taylor resides in Gloucestershire.

== Bibliography ==
=== The Chronicles of St Mary's ===
Taylor's flagship series follows the staff of St Mary's Institute of Historical Research, especially the historian Dr Madeleine "Max" Maxwell, as they time-travel to "investigate major historical events in contemporary time".

Novels

1. Just One Damned Thing After Another (June 2013)
2. A Symphony of Echoes (October 2013)
3. A Second Chance (February 2014)
4. A Trail Through Time (July 2014)
5. No Time Like the Past (February 2015)
6. What Could Possibly Go Wrong? (August 2015)
7. Lies, Damned Lies, and History (May 2016)
8. And the Rest is History (April 2017)
9. An Argumentation of Historians (May 2018)
10. Hope For the Best (May 2019)
11. Plan For The Worst (April 2020)
12. Another Time, Another Place (April 2021)
13. A Catalogue of Catastrophe (April 2022)
14. The Good, The Bad and The History (June 2023)

Short stories

- When a Child is Born (November 2013)
- Roman Holiday (June 2014)
- Christmas Present (November 2014)
- The Very First Damned Thing (October 2015)
- Ships and Stings and Wedding Rings (November 2015)
- The Great St Mary's Day Out (August 2016)
- My Name is Markham (December 2016)
- A Perfect Storm (August 2017)
- Christmas Past (25 December 2017)
- The Battersea Barricades (23 April 2018)
- The Steam Pump Jump (12 July 2018)
- And Now For Something Completely Different (25 December 2018)
- When Did You Last See Your Father? (5 September 2019)
- Why is Nothing Ever Simple? (25 December 2019)
- The Ordeal of the Haunted Room (25 December 2020)
- The Toast of Time (25 December 2021)
- Christmas Pie (25 December 2023)
- Lights! Camera! Mayhem! (25 December 2024)
- Murder at Martingale Manor (25 December 2025)

Collections

- The Chronicles of St Mary's Boxset, Volume 1 (February 2015) – novels 1–3
- The Long and Short of It (June 2017) - A collection of short stories (The Very First Damned Thing; When a Child is Born; Roman Holiday; Christmas Present; Ships and Stings and Wedding Rings; The Great St Mary's Day Out; My Name is Markham; A Perfect Storm)
- Long Story Short (July 2019) – The second collection of short stories (Christmas Past; The Battersea Barricades; The Steam-Pump Jump; And Now For Something Completely Different; When Did You Last See Your Father?; Desiccated Water; Markham and the Anal Probing; Little Donkey)
- The Most Wonderful Time of the Year: A Christmas Short-Story Collection (December 2023) - (Why is Nothing Ever Simple?; The Ordeal of the Haunted Room; The Toast of Time; Santa Grint; Joy to the World)

=== The Time Police ===
Novels

- Doing Time (October 2019)
- Hard Time (October 2020)
- Saving Time (October 2021)
- About Time (October 2022)
- Killing Time (June 2024)
- Out of Time (October 2025)

Short Stories

- Santa Grint (December 2022)

=== Related novels ===
- The Ballad of Smallhope and Pennyroyal (September 2024)
- Smallhope and Pennyroyal 2: A Family Affair (August 2026)

=== Frogmorton Farm ===
Novels

- The Nothing Girl (May 2014)
- The Something Girl (July 2017)

Short stories

- Little Donkey (February 2015)
- Joy to the World (November 2020)

=== Elizabeth Cage ===
- White Silence (September 2017)
- Dark Light (September 2018)
- Long Shadows (August 2021)
- Bad Moon (May 2025)

=== Writing as Isabella Barclay ===
- A Bachelor Establishment (July 2015)
