= Double X Science =

Online magazine

Double X Science is an online science- and skepticism-oriented magazine aimed at women, established in October 2011. It describes its goal as to "bring evidence-based science stories and angles on science specifically of interest to the female-gendered audience." The website was co-founded by Emily Willingham; other contributors include Matthew Francis of Galileo's Pendulum and Chris Gunter, formerly the genetics and genomics editor of Nature. The site is funded by the National Association of Science Writers. Deborah Blum has endorsed the site.
