= Jeanne Kalogridis =

American writer

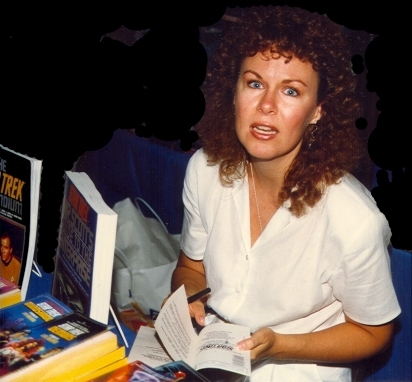
- J.M. Dillard at a Tampa, Florida Star Trek convention, 1989
- Born: 1954 (age 71–72); Florida, U.S.
- Education: University of South Florida (BA, MA)
- Occupation: Writer
- Writing career
- Pen name: J.M. Dillard
- Genres: Historical fiction; science fiction; horror fiction

Jeanne Kalogridis (pronounced Jean Kal-o-GREED-us), also known by the pseudonym J.M. Dillard (born 1954), is an American writer of historical, science and horror fiction.

She was born in Florida and studied at the University of South Florida, earning first a BA in Russian and then an MA in Linguistics. After college she taught English as a foreign language at the American University in Washington, D.C., before moving to the West Coast.

== Bibliography of works ==
=== The Diaries of the Family Dracul ===
- Covenant with the Vampire (1995)
- Children of the Vampire (1996)
- Lord of the Vampires (1997)

=== Novels ===
- Specters (1991) (as J.M. Dillard)
- The Burning Times (1997)
- The Borgia Bride (2005)
- I, Mona Lisa (2006) (UK title: Painting Mona Lisa)
- The Devil's Queen (2009)
- The Scarlet Contessa: A Novel of the Italian Renaissance (2010)
- The Inquisitor's Wife (2013)
- The Orphan of Florence (2017)

=== Movie Novelizations ===
- The Fugitive (1993)
- Bulletproof Monk (2003)

=== Star Trek: The Original Series ===
- Mindshadow (1985)
- Demons (1986)
- Bloodthirst (1987)
- The Lost Years (1989)
- Recovery (1995)

=== Star Trek Movie Novelizations ===
- Star Trek V: The Final Frontier (1989)
- Star Trek VI: The Undiscovered Country (1991)
- Star Trek Generations (1994)
- Star Trek: First Contact (1996)
- Star Trek: Insurrection (1998)
- Star Trek: Nemesis (2002)

=== Star Trek: The Next Generation ===
- Possession (1996) (with Kathleen O'Malley)
- Resistance (2007)

=== Star Trek: Deep Space Nine ===
- Emissary (1993)

=== Star Trek: Enterprise ===
- Surak's Soul (2003)
- The Expanse (2003)

=== War of the Worlds ===
- The Resurrection (1988)

=== Other books ===
- Star Trek: Where No One Has Gone Before - A History in Pictures (1994)
- Star Trek: The Next Generation Sketchbook - The Movie: Generations & First Contact (1998) (with John Eaves)
