= The Birth of Venus (novel) =

2003 novel by Sarah Dunant

The Birth of Venus: A Novel
- First edition book cover, Random House
- Author: Sarah Dunant
- Language: English
- Publisher: Random House
- Publication date: February 1, 2004
- Publication place: United States
- Media type: Print (Hardcover)
- Pages: 416 pp
- ISBN: 1-4000-6073-7
- OCLC: 52268659
- Dewey Decimal: 823/.914 21
- LC Class: PR6054.U45756 B58 2003b

The Birth of Venus: A Novel is a 2003 novel by Sarah Dunant, a bestselling British author. The story is set in the late 15th century in Florence, Italy. It was first published by Little, Brown in 2003 with the title The Birth of Venus: Love and Death in Florence.

== Plot overview ==
A young Florentine girl, Alessandra Cecchi, is drawn to a young painter commissioned to paint the family's chapel walls. The painter is brought to her home by her father, a rich textile merchant whose business would be negatively affected by the rise of Girolamo Savonarola in Florence over the next few years. The book follows Alessandra's daily life, and is written in the first person, as a memoir written by Alessandra late in her life. Her passion for painting and learning serve her well, but her family does not approve. Her mother tries her hardest to shape Alessandra into a woman who will be desired by a successful and powerful man. Eventually, after Alessandra has met the painter, but before her feelings for him and his talent have made themselves known to her, her hateful brother Tomaso suggests strong but quiet Cristoforo Langella as a potential husband for her. She marries him shortly afterward.

Meanwhile, her attraction to the painter grows, as does her affection for her husband Cristoforo. Alessandra's observations of the political turbulence in Florence are key to the storyline. Dunant captures the personal conflict felt by Alessandra – she feels torn between Savonarola's fiery message and her own ideas. She believes she knows what is right, but does not know what she will do about it.

Alessandra realizes that her duty to her family and to her spouse cannot take over her life, and eventually realizes her passion for the painter. Her romance, it seems, is necessary, because she is the only one who can save him.
