= Mary Sue =

Overly competent fictional character

The Mary Sue is a type of fictional character, usually a young woman, who is perceived as unrealistically free of weaknesses or character flaws, or as serving a wish-fulfillment role for the author. The term "Mary Sue" can also refer to a genre of fan fiction featuring such characters. The name is derived from the main character of a 1973 parody short story by Paula Smith, written to satirize idealized female characters that were widespread in Star Trek fan fiction.

Mary Sue stories are often written by adolescent authors and may represent the author's self-insertion into the story, both in fan fiction and commercially published fiction. The character type has acquired a pejorative reputation in fan communities, with the label "Mary Sue" often applied to any heroine who is considered to be unrealistically capable. Less commonly, a male character with similar traits may be labeled a "Gary Stu" or "Marty Stu".

== History ==
'Gee, golly, gosh, gloriosky,' thought Mary Sue as she stepped on the bridge of the Enterprise. 'Here I am, the youngest lieutenant in the fleet—only fifteen and a half years old.'

— Paula Smith, "A Trekkie's Tale" in Menagerie, December 1973

The term "Mary Sue" is derived from the main character in Paula Smith's 1973 short story "A Trekkie's Tale", published in Smith's and Sharon Ferraro's Star Trek fanzine Menagerie. The story parodied idealized female characters that were common in fan fiction. These were often depicted as beautiful young women possessing special abilities or physical traits, universally beloved by the more established characters, and playing a central role in the story despite not appearing in the source material. Writer Joan Verba described these characters as having any or all of the following elements: being a young (or the youngest) Starfleet officer; being adored by the established characters such as Captain Kirk, Mr. Spock, and Dr. McCoy; possessing extraordinary abilities; winning extraordinary honors; and dying a heroic death, after which she is universally mourned. In 1976, Menagerie's editors wrote:

Mary Sue stories—the adventures of the youngest and smartest ever person to graduate from the academy and ever get a commission at such a tender age. Usually characterized by unprecedented skill in everything from art to zoology, including karate and arm-wrestling. This character can also be found burrowing her way into the good graces/heart/mind of one of the Big Three [Kirk, Spock, and McCoy], if not all three at once. She saves the day by her wit and ability, and, if we are lucky, has the good grace to die at the end, being grieved by the entire ship.

Smith and Ferraro created the character to parody a recurring pattern found in author submissions to Menagerie, in which a young woman would arrive on the Starship Enterprise and quickly win over the established characters. While the Mary Sue character did not originally have a specific gender, these submitted stories tended to be written by women. According to Smith and Ferraro, women made up most of the Star Trek fan base, unlike the larger science fiction fandom. Smith and Ferraro had initially considered other (male) names such as "Murray Sue" or "Marty Sue". Comparing the character to male proxies such as Superman, Smith later said, "It was OK for [men] to have placeholder characters that were incredibly able".

While originally used to describe fan fiction characterizations, the term "Mary Sue" has been applied to characters and stories in commercially published fiction as well. According to folklorist Camille Bacon-Smith, the stories that represent the pure form of the Mary Sue character are "found in the Star Trek section of any bookstore", for example, cadet Piper, the protagonist of the 1986 Star Trek novel Dreadnought! by Diane Carey.

"Mary Sue" can also refer to the fan fiction genre featuring such characters. These stories feature young, attractive, and exceptionally gifted female heroines who serve as the author's self-insertion into the story. They often resolve the conflict of the story, win the love of the other characters and die a heroic death at the end. Mary Sue stories are often written by adolescent authors. An author may create a new character based on themselves, or they may alter an established character's personality and interests to be more like their own.

Less commonly, male characters may be discussed in fan culture as personifying the same wish-fulfillment functions as the Mary Sue. They are referred to by names such as "Larry Stu", "Marty Stu", or "Gary Stu". For example, fans have argued that in Star Trek, the character James T. Kirk is a "Marty Stu". (Note: Paula Smith has used the term "Wesley Sue" for such characters.) In a 2011 interview, Smith cited James Bond and Superman as examples of male Mary Sues, arguing that such characters benefit the male audience's coming of age. Keidra Chaney and Raizel Liebler describe Star Trek: The Next Generation character Wesley Crusher as a "quasi–Gary Sue", who is "a brilliant teen who always seems to discover the answers to problems and who is promoted to the crew of the Enterprise with no formal training".

== Analysis ==
The characteristics of idealization and self-insertion are usually cited by fans as hallmarks of a Mary Sue character. Gender studies researcher Catherine Driscoll writes that "the Mary Sue is generally associated with girl writers who have trouble distancing themselves from the source text enough to write about it rather than write themselves into it". Writing in feminist popular culture magazine Bitch, Chaney and Liebler describe the Mary Sue character as having "an uncanny resemblance to her creator—only stronger, wittier, sexier, friendlier, and without the glasses and bad skin".

The suspicion that a Mary Sue character represents an author's self-insertion is often perceived by audiences as a sign of low artistic quality. Author Ann C. Crispin described the term "Mary Sue" as "a put-down, implying that the character so summarily dismissed is not a true character, no matter how well drawn, what sex, species, or degree of individuality". Writer Valerie E. Frankel describes the term "Mary Sue" as sexist because it assumes no female character should be as powerful as Superman. Smith commented in 1980 that her intent was never "to put down all stories about inspiring females".

Writing instructor Tisha Turk of Grinnell College states that "ultimately the reader, not the author, defines a Mary Sue". Angie Fazekas and Dan Vena write that such characters "provide an opportunity for teenage girls to write themselves into popular culture narratives as the heroines of their own stories". According to Jackie Mansky in Smithsonian, some critics argue that "Mary Sues opened up a gateway for writers, particularly women and members of underrepresented communities, to see themselves in extraordinary characters". Editor Edith Cantor wrote, "just as every dog is allowed one bite, so every Trekwriter should be allowed one Mary Sue", to be given "a sympathetic reading and critique, and perhaps returned to the author with the explanation that she is following a too-well-beaten path".

Bacon-Smith writes that Mary Sue stories are "central to the painful experience of a female fan's adolescence", especially for those who could not or would not remain intellectually or physically subservient to their male peers; they represent a combination of active protagonist with "the culturally approved traits of beauty, sacrifice, and self-effacement". In fan fiction versions, the protagonist traditionally dies at the end of the story; Bacon-Smith says this expresses the "cultural truth" that to enter womanhood in a male-dominated American society, one must kill the "active agent within [herself]"; Mary Sue thus embodies a "fantasy of the perfect woman", who exists to serve the needs of men while minimizing her own abilities.

== Cultural impact ==
The Mary Sue figure has acquired a pejorative reputation in fan communities as a character who is too perfect to be believable. According to Bacon-Smith, the label is "the most universally denigrated genre in the entire canon of fan fiction" and may represent "self-imposed sexism" by limiting the qualities allowed for female characters. Many fans have applied the label "Mary Sue" to any fan fiction character who is considered to be unrealistically capable or appealing, as well as to stories featuring such a character, often labeled "Mary Sue stories".

Bacon-Smith argues that fear of creating a "Mary Sue" may be restricting and even silencing to some writers; she states that participants of a 1990 panel discussion "noted with growing dismay that any female character created within the [fan] community is damned with the term Mary Sue". The Star Trek fanzine Archives has described "Mary Sue" paranoia as partly responsible for a lack of "believable, competent, and identifiable-with female characters".

Gavia Baker-Whitelaw of The Daily Dot describes the fan fiction My Immortal's main character, Ebony Dark'ness Dementia Raven Way, as "a Mary Sue protagonist who was clearly a glorified version of the author". The character Arya Stark from HBO's Game of Thrones series has been labeled a Mary Sue for her heroic role in the show's finale; frustration with this characterization inspired a response on the feminist website The Mary Sue, which took its name as an effort to "re-appropriate" the term.

Media studies researcher Christine Scodari says there is a tendency within slash fandom to apply the label "Mary Sue" to major female characters such as Nyota Uhura, from the film Star Trek (2009), because of a perception that development of the female character takes away screen time from male characters. Twitter users have debated whether the Star Wars sequel trilogy features a Mary Sue in its protagonist, Rey, on the basis of Rey's skills as a mechanic, a fighter, a pilot, and a user of "The Force".

== See also ==
- Author surrogate – Fictional character type
- Competent man – Stock character in science fiction
- Girlboss – Term for an independent, successful woman
- Goody Two-Shoes – 1765 children's story
- Ideal womanhood – Idealized feminine traits
- Magical Negro – Stock character who helps white protagonists
- Manic Pixie Dream Girl – Female stock character who acts as a love interest
- Pollyanna § Influence – 1913 children's novel by Eleanor H. Porter
- Smurfette principle – Having only one female character in an ensemble
