= Development of Spock =

Aspect of the Star Trek character

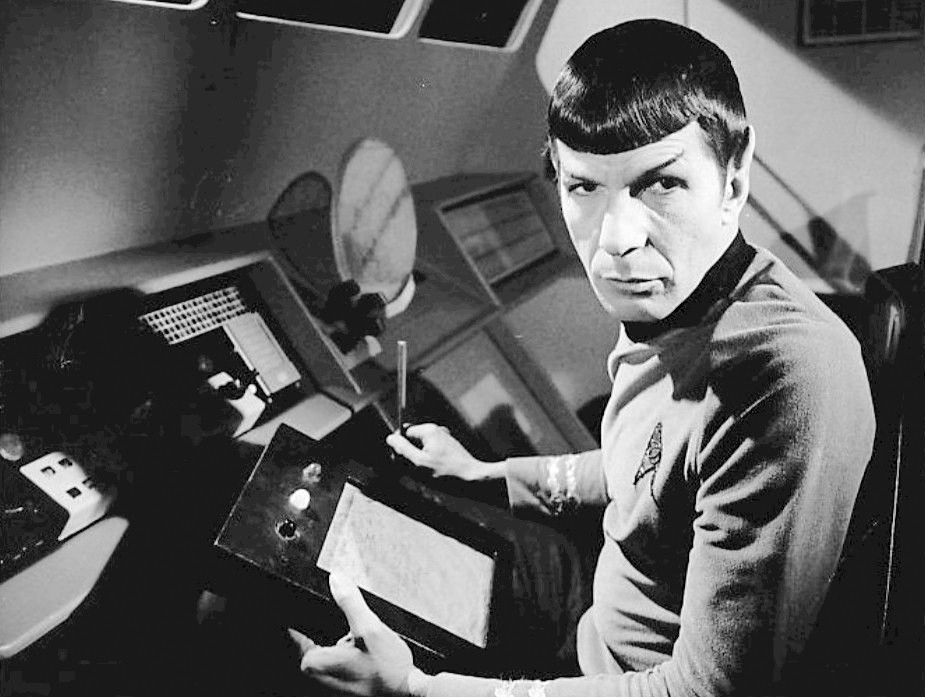
Leonard Nimoy as Spock, from a Star Trek publicity photo

The development of Spock, a fictional character first introduced in the American science fiction television series Star Trek, began prior to the start of the series. The first known mention of Spock was in a discussion between Gene Roddenberry and Gary Lockwood, where the latter suggested Leonard Nimoy for the role. Roddenberry agreed with the suggestion, and Nimoy became the first choice actor for the part. However, Roddenberry was required to audition other actors for the role. It was offered to both DeForest Kelley (who would eventually play Dr. Leonard "Bones" McCoy) and Martin Landau before Nimoy. Nimoy disliked the prosthetic ears he was required to wear, and there were concerns from the studio that they made him appear satanic. Roddenberry fought to keep the character in the second pilot, "Where No Man Has Gone Before" after the rest of the main cast was dropped from the initial pilot, "The Cage".

Soon after the series began broadcasting, "Spockmania" began. Both NBC and individual studios demanded a more prominent role for the character due to the fan response. Prior to the second season, Nimoy renegotiated his salary. During this time, both Mark Lenard and Lawrence Montaigne were seriously considered as replacement Vulcans. Nimoy was retained, and continued to develop the character through the season, creating the iconic Vulcan salute. Following the cancellation of the series, various projects were undertaken during the 1970s to re-launch Star Trek. Nimoy had dropped out of working on them after his likeness was used in a Heineken advertisement without his permission. The character of Xon, played by David Gautreaux, was created as a replacement for him in the series Star Trek: Phase II; however when the production became Star Trek: The Motion Picture, Nimoy was persuaded to return.

Nimoy agreed to return for Star Trek II: The Wrath of Khan with the promise of a death scene for the character. The fan response was overwhelmingly negative to the news, but after Nimoy enjoyed the production, he asked if there was a means in which the death could be ambiguous. Nimoy returned for the next film, and convinced studio chief Michael Eisner that he should direct it. Spock was revived in the film. The film was successful, and he was asked to direct the following film, Star Trek IV: The Voyage Home as well. Due to delays in negotiating William Shatner's contract, consideration was given to re-booting the franchise and starting again with new, younger actors. This was abandoned; Star Trek V: The Final Frontier, directed by Shatner, introduced a previously unmentioned half brother of Spock, Sybok. Following the poor reception of the film, a re-boot was once again considered, but instead Nimoy was asked to organise the sixth film, Star Trek VI: The Undiscovered Country. To promote the film, he agreed to appear in The Next Generation.

He refused to return for Star Trek Generations as the expected role was not significant enough, and the character did not return to the franchise again until 2009's Star Trek, where it was recast and portrayed by Zachary Quinto. Nimoy also agreed to return, playing the older version of the character. Quinto sought his advice about how to play the character, and the two became friends. Nimoy appeared one final time in a cameo within the 2013 film Star Trek Into Darkness; he died in February 2015 prior to production on the 2016's Star Trek Beyond. Within that film, a scene was included to reference the in-universe death of the older version of the character.

== The Original Series ==
=== Origins and "The Cage" ===
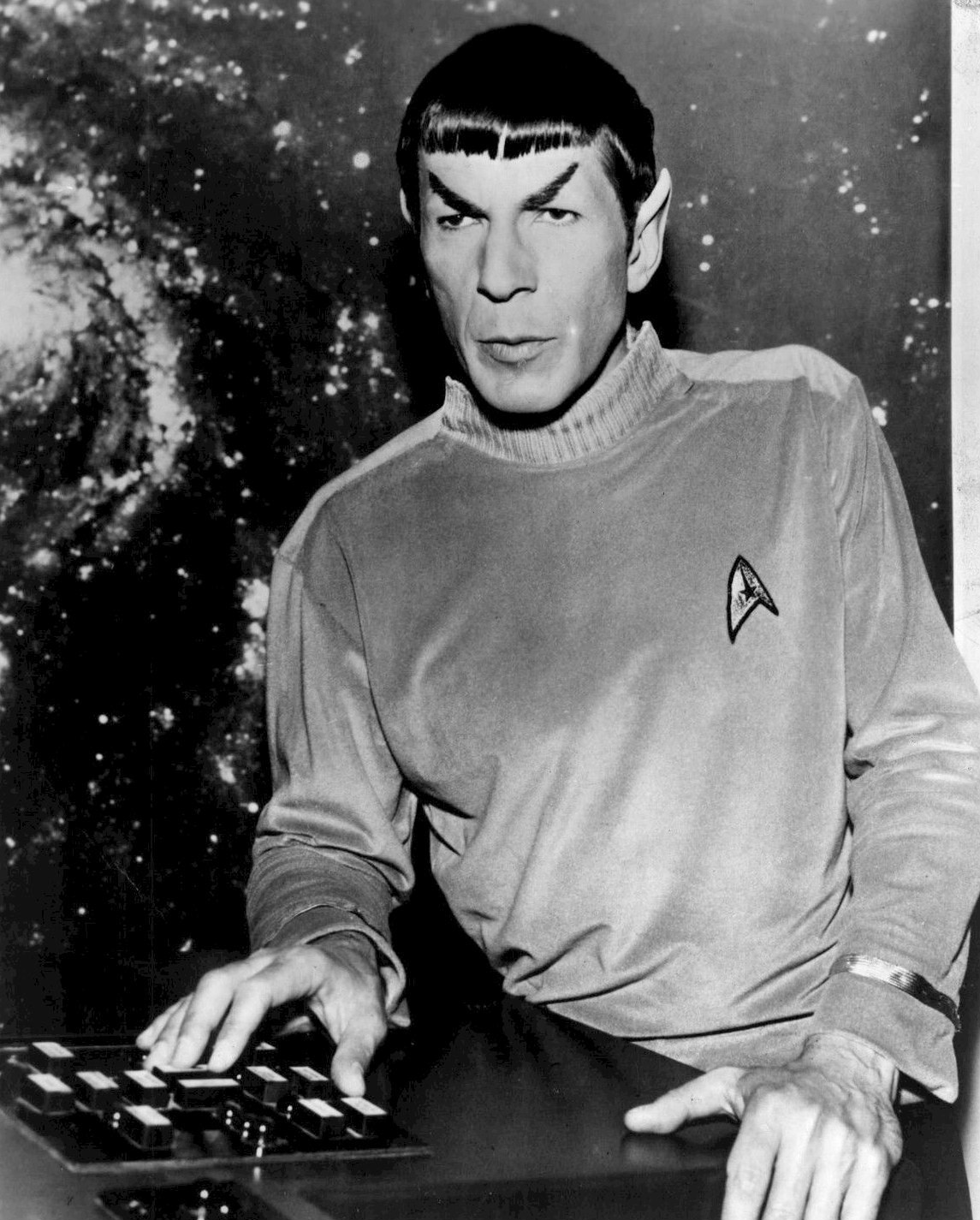
Nimoy as Spock from the Star Trek pilots

The earliest mention of Spock known was in a conversation Gene Roddenberry had with Gary Lockwood at Roddenberry's home. Lockwood had been the lead actor on Roddenberry's The Lieutenant which had just been cancelled after one season. Roddenberry explained in that conversation that he had created an alien with the name of Spock. (It was not until much later that he became aware of bestselling pediatrician Dr. Benjamin Spock.) Roddenberry wanted the alien to be very intelligent and possibly green. He asked Lockwood for his advice about who could play the character, and was reminded about Leonard Nimoy, who had made a guest appearance in The Lieutenant episode "In the Highest Tradition". Several days afterwards, Roddenberry's secretary Dorothy Fontana read his new Star Trek proposal, asking Roddenberry immediately if he had someone in mind to play Spock. She was handed a glossy photograph of Nimoy in response.

Despite having Nimoy immediately in mind for the part, Roddenberry was required to audition other actors for the part. Actors who read for the part included Victor Lundin, and both Rex Holman and Michael Dunn were considered. The network, NBC, were pushing for a known actor to play the role, as was Robert Butler, who was to direct the Star Trek pilot, "The Cage". Butler opposed the casting of DeForest Kelley as the doctor character, but both he and the NBC executives thought he would be good as Spock. Roddenberry met with Kelley and offered him the job, but he did not want to play the alien character. Seeking to get a different star, Roddenberry offered the role to Martin Landau, but he did not want to play the same character on a weekly basis and found the character's lack of emotions limiting. (Note: J.M. Dillard's 1994 book Star Trek: "Where No Man Has Gone Before" – A History in Pictures contradicts this, saying that Roddenberry would have only sought to offer the role to Landau had Nimoy turned it down.)

During an interview segment of TV Land's 40th Anniversary Star Trek Marathon on November 12, 2006 Leonard Nimoy revealed that Gene Roddenberry's first choice to play Spock was George Lindsey. Because of the flippant way Nimoy made the comment it has been suggested that he was joking. The claim that Lindsey was offered the role was given more credibility when Lindsey's close friend Ernest Borgnine wrote in his autobiography, "my hand to God - he turned down the part of Mr. Spock on TV's Star Trek, the role that made Leonard Nimoy famous."

When offered, Nimoy accepted the role. However, he was still apprehensive as he wanted to have a serious acting career and did not want to be made to look foolish by playing an alien with pointy ears and other as-then undetermined makeup. When the character was included in the original 1964 pitch, Roddenberry wrote that the character was "probably half Martian, he has a slightly reddish complexion and semi-pointed ears". Early versions had the character ingest energy through a plate in his stomach. Writer Samuel A. Peeples told Roddenberry these attributes made Spock too alien, and suggested "he should at least be half-human and have the problems of both sides", believing the human traits made the character more interesting and able to comment on the human condition more believably. Spock's home planet was changed because Roddenberry thought if the show was a success, humans might actually walk on Mars during the series' run. The eventual logical nature of Spock was originally written into the character Number One as portrayed by Majel Barrett. It was not until the second pilot that this was included as one of Spock's traits.

The first makeup tests for Spock were conducted as production began on the pilot. Lee Greenway, a makeup artist for Desilu Studios, applied papier-mâché and liquid latex directly to Nimoy's ears. A variety of tests were conducted over the course of four or five days. The actor was horrified at the results, saying the creations made him look like an "overgrown jackrabbit" or an "elf with a hyperactive thyroid". Fred Phillips was subsequently asked to make the ears, but he passed this task onto John Chambers so he could concentrate on achieving the right shade of red for Spock's skin.

The red hue was abandoned, as when viewed on television sets it made Nimoy look dark skinned. The makeup artists tried a yellow hue instead, which lightened Nimoy on television and it was agreed that this was an improvement. Meanwhile, Chambers re-created an ear mould as the ones created earlier for Nimoy were damaged. These new moulds would be the basis of the well known Spock ears. Each time Nimoy wore the ears, they were glued into place and could only be removed with solvent. But the ears were damaged in their removal, and so each pair could only be worn once.

Elf jokes from the crew were irritating Nimoy, and he complained to Roddenberry that the character could ruin his career and he no longer wanted to play Spock. Roddenberry talked him around, and Nimoy said to a journalist at the time that "Playing some monster or freak can be the kiss of death for an actor, and this emotionless guy with pointy ears from another planet just didn't appeal to me", but he and Roddenberry had "talked it over and agreed I wouldn't just be a walking computer who gives scientific data." Furthermore, Roddenberry pledged to Nimoy that if the actor remained unhappy with the ears by the 13th episode then he would find a means of removing them from the show. Fellow cast member Laurel Goodwin assured Nimoy that the character, including the ears, would make him a sex symbol. She also suggested the styling of Nimoy's sideburns into points.

Nimoy was not the only person concerned with Spock's ears. NBC executives were worried that it made him appear satanic, and were concerned that viewers would not wish to associate with an alien character. At the time, Roddenberry felt that the satanic issue might prove positive as he believed that female viewers would find a slightly dangerous and taboo character more attractive. This was supported by female visitors to the set who seemed to be immediately drawn to Nimoy.

=== "Where No Man Has Gone Before" and the first season ===
Following the failure of "The Cage" to launch Star Trek into series, and the unexpected ordering of a second pilot, NBC wanted the majority of the main cast dropped. They specifically stated that Spock should not appear in the new pilot. But Roddenberry was determined to keep the character, announcing to NBC that he would not do a new pilot without Spock. He said that the character acted as a constant and much needed reminder to the viewer that the series was set in space. NBC backed down, but insisted that he only be used as a background character in the new pilot, "Where No Man Has Gone Before". During the course of the production, the logical manner previously seen in Number One in "The Cage" was written into the Spock character.

Star Trek went to series on the basis of the second pilot, but still fearing backlash against Spock's ears, and issues with selling the show to stations in the Bible Belt, NBC airbrushed out the pointed tips in an advertising brochure about the series. Spock's role was used as audition material for new cast members. Nichelle Nichols was intrigued by the role when she read his lines, and asked why the character could not be female. The producers' response was that Nimoy would not like it. It was during the filming of the first non-pilot episode to be shot, "The Corbomite Maneuver", that under the direction of Joseph Sargent, Nimoy was directed to remain aloof during a tense moment and said the catchphrase "fascinating" for the first time. This moment was subsequently given by the writing staff as an example of how the character should act. Nimoy liked Spock's newly logical nature, observing that the character is "struggling to maintain a Vulcan attitude, a Vulcan philosophical posture and a Vulcan logic, opposing what was fighting him internally, which was human emotion". Nimoy stated that after "The Naked Time", in which a disease causes Spock to cry, "I knew that we were not playing a man with no emotions, but a man who had great pride, who had learned to control his emotions and who would deny that he knew what emotions were. In a way, he was more human than anyone else on the ship."

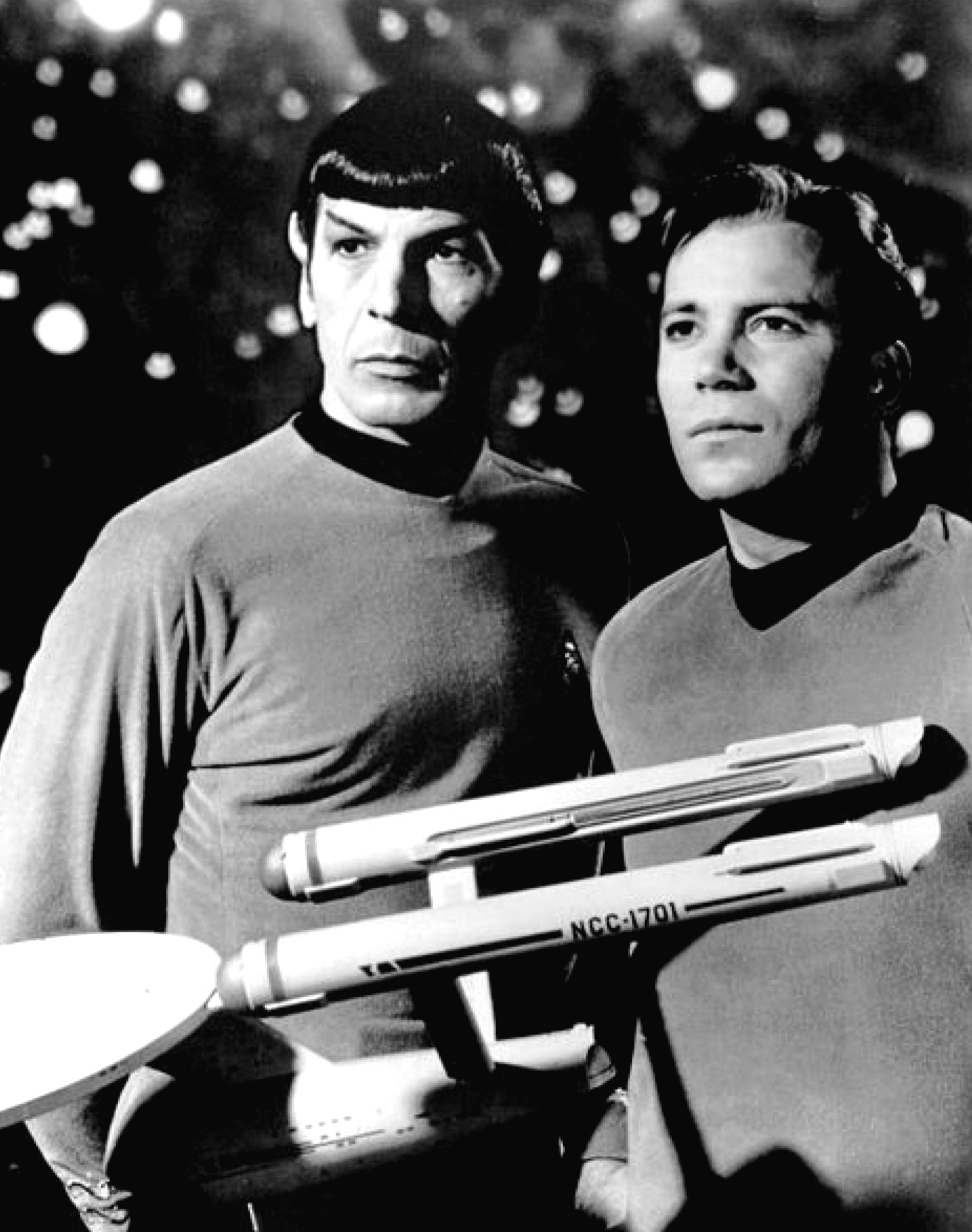
Spock's popularity incensed William Shatner, who felt that Captain Kirk should have been the most popular.

The tendency to keep Spock as a background character continued for the first eight episodes of The Original Series, when the NBC executives called Roddenberry and producer Herbert Franklin Solow to their offices in Burbank. The executives complained that Spock was not appearing frequently in the show. They had received requests from local stations asking for Spock-centric episodes, which they referred to as "Spockmania". When told that it was NBC who requested he be a background character, they flatly denied it and said it was obvious how popular Spock had become. Roddenberry showed them the advertising brochure as evidence and only then did they apologise. It was decided to switch the romantic lead in "This Side of Paradise" from Hikaru Sulu to Spock, something that made Nimoy apprehensive. But he subsequently said he enjoyed being able to act out Spock's emotions, and praised writer D. C. Fontana for expanding Vulcan culture within the series.

The sudden increase in popularity of Spock caused William Shatner, who portrayed Captain James T. Kirk, to be dismayed that he was not portraying the favourite character. Although he was being paid $5,000 an episode, plus a percentage of profits, and Nimoy was being paid $1,250 an episode, it was the latter who was receiving several sacks of fan mail a week. The fan mail figures were leaked to the press, angering Shatner. This animosity from Shatner increased when reporters from Time arrived at the studio and set up for a photoshoot around Nimoy's makeup chair. Shatner and James Doohan were also in the makeup room, and Doohan later recalled that once Shatner realised he was being ignored, he jumped from his chair, shouted that he was the captain of the show and from then on he would have his makeup applied in his trailer. The popularity of Spock had built to the extent that gossip columnists in Hollywood spread rumours among agents that Shatner was going to be dropped from the series and replaced with Nimoy as the lead.

Following the end of the first season, producer Robert H. Justman decided to prank Nimoy. He had partially convinced Nimoy that it would have been preferable to have permanent plastic surgery to point the tips of his ears instead of requiring the hour and a half of makeup each day to apply them. It was only when Nimoy began to agree with Justman's suggestion that the producer let on that it was a joke, which Nimoy found amusing. Nimoy became unhappy with his pay during the course of the season, since Shatner was being paid more than he was. But he was asked by the producers to table the discussion until confirmation was received that the series was renewed.

=== Contract renegotiation and the second season ===
Following the confirmation of the second season, Nimoy's agent sought to increase the salary on Nimoy's signed contract in response to the growing popularity of his character. Although negotiations started at $3,000 per episode, the agent made it known that Nimoy would settle for $2,500, half of what Shatner was being paid but twice as much as before. While this was being considered by the producers, Nimoy's agent misheard a conversation between Solow and a colleague regarding Mission: Impossible (A series that Nimoy would co-star on after Star Trek) salaries and was led to believe that Martin Landau and his wife Barbara Bain were receiving a combined salary of $11,000 per episode. Enraged, he demanded that Nimoy received $9,000 an episode. Roddenberry suggested suspending Nimoy and initiating legal action in response, and replacing Spock with a new Vulcan character.

The production team began compiling a list of actors who could be brought in to portray a replacement for Spock. At the head of this list was Mark Lenard, who had already appeared as the Romulan commander in the episode "Balance of Terror". While greatly admired by the crew, he was ruled out as they felt that he lacked the required depth and sensitivity. The second choice was Lawrence Montaigne, and when he appeared in "Amok Time" as Stonn, an option to retain him for the rest of the series was written into his contract. Although only Lenard and Montaigne were seriously considered, several other actors were initially listed including David Carradine, William Smithers, Liam Sullivan and Stewart Moss.

With the Star Trek producers threatening to sue his client if he did not attend the production of episodes, Nimoy's agent went directly to the executives at NBC. Horrified that they would lose Spock and the marketing potential for the character, they demanded that Solow and Roddenberry negotiate. Eventually, it was agreed that Nimoy's salary would increase to $2,500, plus $100 for expenses, improvements to billing and greater input on scripts.

Roddenberry became concerned at the concentration of the fanbase on Spock and not Kirk. He wrote to his friend, noted science fiction writer Isaac Asimov, for advice on what to do about the situation. They corresponded several times on the subject, and Asimov suggested several ideas to enhance Kirk's popularity. These included placing the character in disguises to make Kirk seem more fun, or to create situations where Spock must save Kirk's life to demonstrate who the more important character was.

Nimoy continued to develop Spock alongside individual directors. When work was underway on "Amok Time", he discussed with Joseph Pevney how Vulcans would greet each other. Nimoy suggested the use of a hand signal from the Priestly Blessing as performed by Jewish Kohen. He had seen this as a child, although Nimoy's father had told him not to look as they performed the blessing. This became the basis for the Vulcan salute. Solow later said that Nimoy was the key contributor to the character's depiction, saying that the "Mr Spock character was 20% created by Gene Roddenberry, 20% created by me and 60% created by Leonard Nimoy". Nimoy recalled, "As a Jew from Catholic Boston, I understood what it was like to feel alienated, apart from the mainstream... there were a number of values in Star Trek that I felt very comfortable with as a Jew". The character influenced Nimoy as well; years after the show he wrote that "To this day, I sense Vulcan speech patterns, Vulcan social attitudes and even Vulcan patterns of logic and emotional suppression in my behavior."

During the course of the second season, Nimoy recorded the album Leonard Nimoy Presents Mr. Spock's Music from Outer Space. Based on his creation of the character, Roddenberry demanded half the royalties, causing a rift with Nimoy. Their working relationship was exacerbated by the number of times Nimoy asked for changes to the scripts under his new contract, as he was unhappy when Spock was only featured in the background while saying catchphrases. By the end of the second season, Roddenberry and Nimoy's relationship had diminished to the point that they were only speaking through formal letters to each other. The relationship never recovered, and remained frosty for the rest of Roddenberry's life.

=== Season three and "Spock's Brain" ===
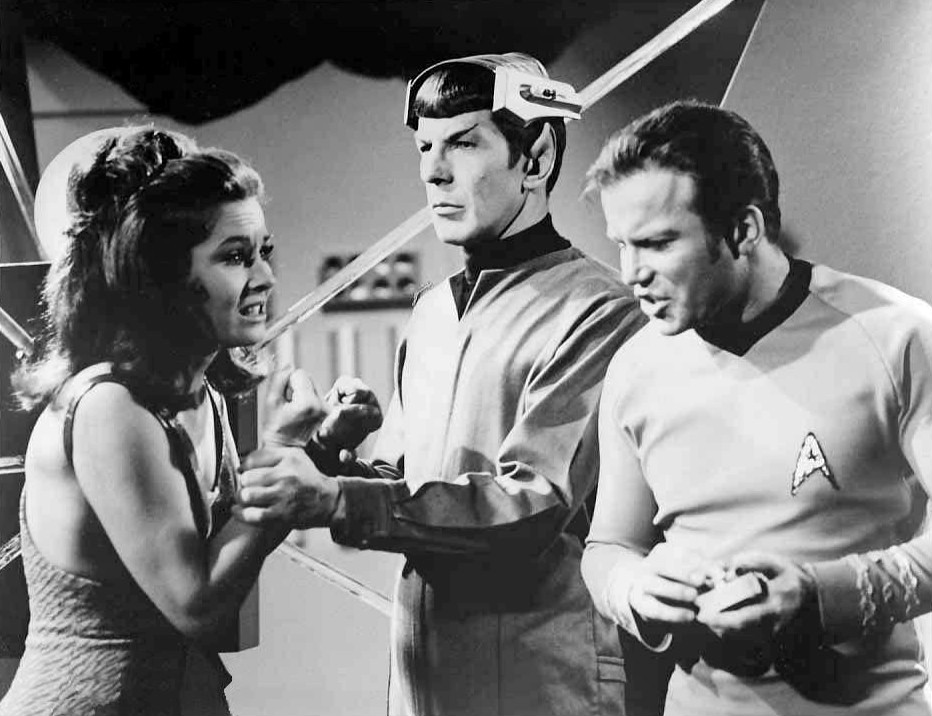
Kirk controls Spock via remote control in "Spock's Brain"

In a production memo before the third season, Roddenberry credited Nimoy and the show's writers for developing Spock into a "fully dimensional" character. Roddenberry said Spock was difficult to write properly, and encouraged the writers to revisit some of the character's more colorful aspects, such as his music-playing and ongoing chess game with Kirk. He also said fans' most frequent request was for more confrontation between McCoy and Spock. With a move to an unfavourable timeslot for the third season, Roddenberry decided to step back as show runner. NBC brought in Fred Freiberger, who did not have any history with the series. At a meeting with Roddenberry, Shatner and Nimoy, Freiberger openly asked Roddenberry whether it was Kirk or Spock who was meant to be the main character. With both actors looking on in anticipation of an answer, Roddenberry refused to give a response at first. He then stormed out of the room, yelling, "It's Bill. Bill is the star of the series," as he left.

Producer Gene L. Coon also left the series prior to the third season, and Nimoy subsequently found it more difficult to ensure that Spock was written in a manner that he preferred. This was because Roddenberry and Coon had been guiding the writers on how to write the characters during the first two seasons, and re-writing those scripts where required. With them both gone, the new writers would often write out of character situations for the main cast to perform. One of Nimoy's major complaints of the third season was the episode "Spock's Brain". His complaints were vocal, as he did not appreciate Spock being made a fool of in the episode.

A well-known scene from the third season was the kiss between Kirk and Uhura, played by Nichols, from the episode "Plato's Stepchildren", one of the first interracial kisses on an American network television. As it was written in the script, this was to have been between Spock and Uhura. But Shatner, using his influence with the writers and producers, demanded that since he was the star of the show and that this would be a historic moment, that it should be re-written so that his character was featured instead of Spock.

== Phase II and The Motion Picture ==
During the 1970s, following on from the success of the series in broadcast syndication, Roddenberry sought to create a Star Trek film. However, during this period Nimoy had been difficult to pin down. While the film was in the guise of Star Trek: The God Thing, Nimoy had agreed to appear. However, after his likeness as Spock was used in Heineken adverts without his permission and without any royalties, he dropped out of the production which by this point had been relaunched as Star Trek: Planet of the Titans. This caused some concern among the other actors, as they were worried that the production would not go ahead without him. These issues were resolved, and one version of the script by director Philip Kaufman would have featured Spock as the main character, facing off against a Klingon nemesis played by Toshiro Mifune.

The film idea was abandoned, and instead production moved on to Star Trek: Phase II, a new television series intended for the Paramount Television Service upon its launch in April 1978. It was claimed by Roddenberry that Nimoy said he was unwilling to return to television as Spock. However, Nimoy said that the first offer Roddenberry gave was a contract for the pilot of the new series, and then guaranteed appearances in two out of every 11 episodes thereafter, which Nimoy rejected. At the time, Nimoy had undertaken a legal challenge against Paramount related to the Heineken adverts and Roddenberry had refused to support his case. Work began on a replacement Vulcan, Xon, with David Gautreaux cast. Production gradually changed to the creation of a feature film over the course of five months in 1977. This resulted in Star Trek: The Motion Picture. For the film, Nimoy was persuaded to return by Jeffrey Katzenberg and the film's director Robert Wise. Xon was removed from the story at the request of Gautreaux who did not want to see him as a secondary character. He appeared in the film in a different role.

== Death in The Wrath of Khan ==
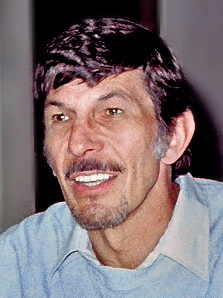
Nimoy in 1980.

Nimoy had not intended to join the cast of Star Trek II: The Wrath of Khan, but was enticed back with the promise that his character would be given a dramatic death scene. Nimoy reasoned that since The Wrath of Khan would be the final Star Trek film, having Spock "go out in a blaze of glory" seemed like a good way to resolve the character's fate. In an early draft of the script, Spock died in the first act in a shocking demise that the movie's producer Harve Bennett compared to Janet Leigh's early death in Psycho. By April 1981, a revised script moved the character's death to the final act. The death scene was shot over three days, during which no visitors were allowed on set.

Fan reaction to leaked news that Spock would be killed was overwhelmingly negative, and one fan paid for advertisements urging Paramount to abandon the plan. Nimoy said afterwards that "I thought everything was managed in excellent taste. I feel proud. When it was first suggested to me that Spock would die, I was hesitant. It seemed exploitative. But now that I've seen how it was accomplished, I think it was a very good idea." Some fans even went so far as to issue death threats against Leonard Nimoy's family. Bennett explained, "For some reason fans got the impression that [Nimoy] wanted Spock dead. He'd written a book 'I Am Not Spock,' and that gave people the idea. Anyway, when a fringe group of Trekkies learned that we were going to kill the Spock character, it was like we'd taken a child of theirs onto the Brooklyn Bridge with the intention of throwing it off. And their reaction was, 'Let's get Leonard.'"

Spock's death was intended to be irrevocable, but Nimoy had such a positive experience during filming that he asked the producers if there was a way for Spock to return in a later film. The scene showing Spock's mind meld with McCoy was filmed without actor DeForest Kelley's prior knowledge of its true meaning. Test audience reaction to Spock's death and the film's ending was poor, so Bennett made it more uplifting by adding a final scene revealing Spock's casket on the Genesis planet. During this scene, Nimoy read the "These are the voyages" monologue—which, until then, was used only to begin Star Trek stories, thus implying Spock's "story" might not be over. Director Nicholas Meyer objected but did not obstruct the changes, and even Nimoy did not know about the new scene until he viewed the film. Before the film opened, the media reassured worried fans that Spock would "live again".

== The later film franchise ==
Nimoy became "excited" about the prospect of portraying Spock once more after he had seen The Wrath of Khan. Paramount Pictures approached him to see if he wanted to play Spock once more, but coupled with a desire to achieve a film career outside of the franchise, he told them he wanted to direct the next film. After convincing studio chief Michael Eisner that he had not had the death of Spock included in his contract for the previous film, and he did not hate Star Trek as Eisner believed, Nimoy was given the job. Eisner immediately joked that the title could be "Leonard Nimoy directs The Search for Spock", and although other story ideas were considered, the general premise remained. One idea which was ruled out, was to have Spock appear in a ghost-like form, similar to Alec Guinness as Obi-Wan Kenobi in The Empire Strikes Back and Return of the Jedi.

Following the success of Star Trek III: The Search for Spock', Nimoy was once again asked to direct. Production was delayed for several months while Shatner negotiated for a pay increase. This resulted in Bennett considering replacing the entire main cast, and filming a prequel instead, with the idea that it would cut down on both Shatner and Nimoy's increasing wage costs and be far more profitable. Shatner, Nimoy and Roddenberry were against the re-boot idea, and when eventually Shatner agreed to a new contract the impetus to replace the cast was lost. Nimoy, on the evolution of Spock in Star Trek IV: The Voyage Home, said "He's a very different Spock. A Spock who's evolving, who's confused. He's trying to figure out who he's supposed to be and how he's supposed to function". He identified the moment when Spock rediscovered himself as the scene where the character says "No, but it is the human thing to do." in response to a question from Kirk about whether rescuing Pavel Chekov from the hospital was logical.

William Shatner directed Star Trek V: The Final Frontier and the film introduced Spock's previously unmentioned half-brother, Sybok. Nimoy had issues with some parts of the early scripts, as they called for Spock to betray Kirk because Sybok helps him to understand his human side. It was changed at Nimoy's suggestion to the revelation that Spock had already come to terms with the human side of his nature, and Sybok had admiration for that. Production was delayed by several months as Nimoy was away directing The Good Mother. In response, Shatner threatened to shoot the film without Nimoy, but it was accepted to be an empty threat.

Following the lackluster reception of The Final Frontier at the box office, Bennett once again proposed a Starfleet Academy style film with an all new main cast to coincide with the 25th anniversary of the franchise. The idea leaked and was argued against on the convention circuit by Roddenberry and the main cast, and Paramount began to receive a huge backlash from the fanbase. Roddenberry said, "Who was going to cast the new Kirk and Spock? No one has ever cast a Trek character besides me that's worked." On the basis of the negative fan reaction, and a limited time-frame before the anniversary, Paramount CEO Frank Mancuso Sr. gave the organisational duties for the sixth film to Nimoy, asking him to appoint producers, writers and a director. Nimoy brought Nicholas Meyer back to Star Trek to direct the sixth film. Together Meyer and Denny Martin Flinn wrote new directions for some of the characters, including the attachment of Spock to his protege, Valeris, played by Kim Cattrall. Nimoy also felt that the theme of Star Trek VI: The Undiscovered Country was successful, saying "Spock experienced prejudice growing up half-Vulcan and half-human, in Star Trek VI, Spock becomes an emissary against prejudice and discovers, during the course of the story, his own prejudices."

=== "Unification" and Generations ===
One of the requirements given by Mancuso to Nimoy when asking him to oversee The Undiscovered Country was to have a handover moment between The Original Series and Star Trek: The Next Generation. The initial idea was to have the film introduce an element that would later be picked up by The Next Generation, and was discussed with Nimoy, Meyer and the series producer Rick Berman. It was agreed that Nimoy would make an appearance as Spock in the series, across a two-part episode, in an idea developed by Berman and Michael Piller. The actor was sold on the idea that Spock would be a central figure in an attempt to reunite the Vulcan and Romulan people in a peaceful manner, which Nimoy liked. The two parts of the episode were shot out of order to accommodate Nimoy's availability across five days. Piller later suggested in hindsight that he could have done a great deal more with Spock but the reunification of the Vulcan and Romulan people was of sufficient "cosmic significance" to warrant the return of the character to television.

Nimoy was approached to direct Star Trek Generations, as well as appear, but turned down both roles as he felt that Spock's part in the film was not significant enough. The intention had been to include Shatner as Kirk, Nimoy as Spock and Kelley as Leonard McCoy. After the latter two turned down appearances, the lines were re-written for James Doohan as Montgomery Scott and Walter Koenig as Chekov. The line by Scotty which starts "I have a theory", had originally been written for Spock.

== Recasting for the Kelvin timeline ==
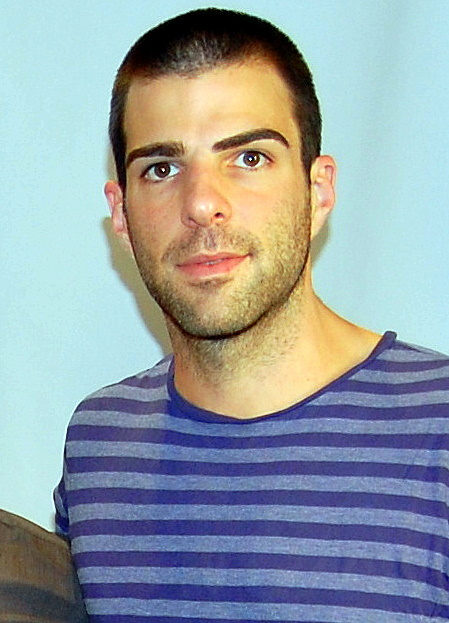
Zachary Quinto was cast as Spock for the 2009 Star Trek film

When considering actors for the part of Spock, the producers of the film sent Nimoy video footage of each one. He highlighted the work of Zachary Quinto, as he felt that the actor looked sufficiently like himself for it to work, and that it seemed like Quinto could portray the inner thought process of the character. Quinto, who previously had appeared as Sylar in the television series Heroes, had heard about the production on the new film and expressed his interest in a December 2006 interview with the Pittsburgh Post-Gazette.

Quinto expressed interest in the role because of the duality of Spock's half-human, half-Vulcan heritage, and how the character "is constantly exploring that notion of how to evolve in a responsible way and how to evolve in a respectful way. I think those are all things that we as a society, and certainly the world, could implement." The Pittsburgh Post-Gazette interview was circulated, and attracted the attention of director J. J. Abrams. Quinto was subsequently the first actor to be cast in the film, while Nimoy was confirmed to return as the older "Prime" version of Spock from the main timeline.

Nimoy said he had returned to the role because of the script and the enthusiasm shown by Abrams alongside Roberto Orci and Alex Kurtzman explaining what they wanted from the script and the Spock character. He added, "I had felt marginalized for a long time. I hadn't been asked to be involved with Star Trek for something like 17 or 18 years. And this felt like somebody said, 'There's a value to you, that we'd like to take advantage of and do something with.' And it felt good. It felt good. It felt like being, frankly, appreciated. I was happy to go back to work." Nimoy subsequently befriended Quinto. Although Quinto watched some episodes of The Original Series during breaks in filming, he said Nimoy was his main resource in playing Spock.

Nimoy made his final appearance as Spock as a cameo in the 2013 film, Star Trek Into Darkness. Abrams approached him and asked for a favor, and Nimoy agreed as he felt that the lines could only be said by his version of Spock and was about the character itself. The appearance was kept a secret until the premiere, as it was shot at Bad Robot headquarters in Santa Monica, California, with only Nimoy and Abrams present. Nimoy did not rule out a further appearance as Spock, saying that he would hear what Abrams had to offer since he considered him a friend and he had done "a great thing for Star Trek". Nimoy died on February 27, 2015, ahead of the production of the third Kelvin timeline film, Star Trek Beyond. Quinto later said at a Beyond fan event, "In a way I feel like he’s more a part of this film than he was the other two. We were all so cognizant of his absence but I think in the face of that, we all held him in our hearts more fully. Everyone on this film showed up to work in the spirit of celebrating his life and his indelible contribution to this franchise... He’s there in a really powerful way." Director Justin Lin confirmed that there would be an indication that Spock from the main timeline had died in the film.

== Recasting for Star Trek: Discovery and Star Trek: Strange New Worlds ==
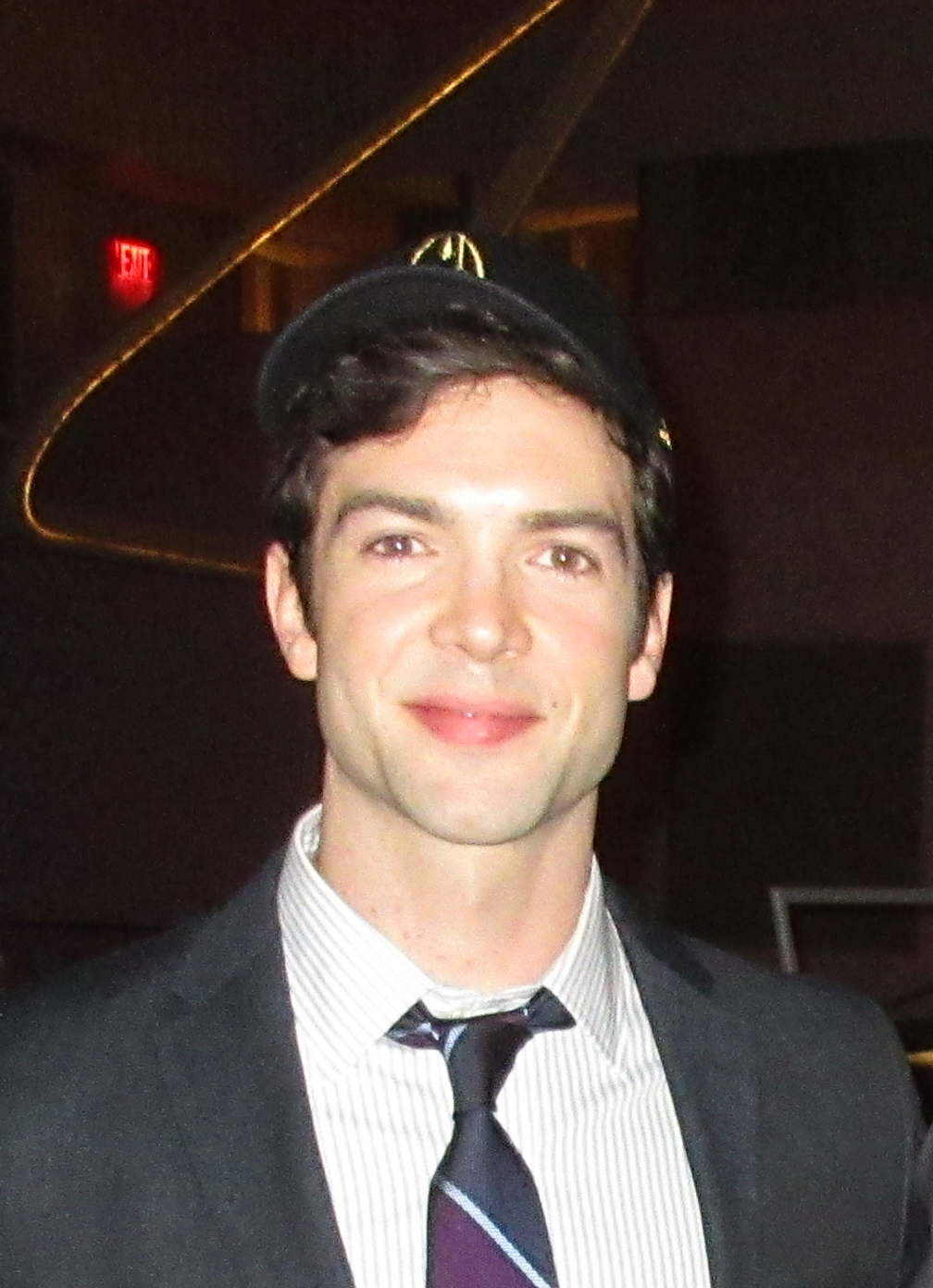
Ethan Peck is the latest actor playing Spock cast in 2018 and on-screen since 2019 in Star Trek: Discovery and then in Star Trek: Strange New Worlds

Officially announced for the role in August 2018 and first premiering in the role of Spock on-screen 1 March 2019 in season 2 of Star Trek: Discovery, and now on Star Trek: Strange New Worlds, Ethan Peck is the third actor to play Spock. Peck's Spock is set in a prequel of the Prime Timeline of the Original Series (and subsequent features). Peck's Spock is noted to be less rigid and more emotional which some have stated is "out of character". However, other sources state that this behavior is much more in line with early Spock in the Original Series as well.

Peck was unaware at the time that he was auditioning for Spock when he first auditioned for the role. He thought he was auditioning for a minor role instead as the project had a code name which he only knew meant Star Trek. After 2 auditions when he finally learned what role he was auditioning for he stated, "'I was terrified of the audition, but also of the need to live up to this mythical icon, as Spock has become.'" During his final audition he got so nervous that he claims he doesn't even remember it. When he finally got the role, he felt like he didn't deserve it. Peck has described feeling like he is constantly evolving and growing into Spock and out of his imposter syndrome. He has also stated that he doesn't feel like he owns Spock, but rather is more of a "custodian" of the role.

Peck was not familiar with Star Trek in his younger years despite being a science fiction fan finding the franchise and its concepts to be "frightening" as was stepping into the legacy of Spock for him. He later became a fan after experiencing the J.J Abrams' Star Trek movies. He wished he could do something like that and now he is stating that, "it's exactly where I want to be in terms of genre."

We also see a romantic relationship form between Nurse Chapel and Spock in this series. Alongside this is his relationship with T'Pring, including a "sexual encounter. This is a first peek into Spock's sex life that we haven't seen in other iterations of the character. Peck was unsure how to balance the Human and Vulcan nature of the scene with the level of sexuality and weirdness that it should entail. The struggle and failure of these relationships also led to Spock's Human and Vulcan sides to be able to be further examined, explored, and learned. Another item Peck has brought more forward into the role is Spock's capacity for humor and deeper dive into his emotions and Human-Vulcan inner turmoil.

This iteration also introduces Spock's foster sister, Michael Burnham.
