= Star Trek: The God Thing =

Unproduced American film script

- Cover artwork of a planned but cancelled Pocket Books novelization
- Written by: Gene Roddenberry
- Story by: Gene Roddenberry; Jon Povill
- Based on: Star Trek by Gene Roddenberry
- Produced by: Gene Roddenberry; Jeffrey Katzenberg (executive)
- Starring: William Shatner; Leonard Nimoy; DeForest Kelley; James Doohan; Walter Koenig; Nichelle Nichols; George Takei
- Music by: Alexander Courage (theme)
- Production company: Paramount Pictures
- Country: United States
- Language: English

Star Trek: The God Thing is an unproduced film script written by Star Trek series creator Gene Roddenberry. Following the success of Star Trek in broadcast syndication during the early 1970s, Paramount Pictures sought to produce a feature film based on the property. The film's plot follows the Enterprise crew after the events of The Original Series: when an alien entity declares itself God and begins travel to Earth, Admiral James T. Kirk reunites the crew, who send it back to its own dimension. Roddenberry completed the story on June 30, 1976, but Paramount rejected the script for reasons Roddenberry attributed to the religious views of company executives. Some story elements evolved into Star Trek: The Motion Picture, and bore resemblance to the plot of the later Star Trek V: The Final Frontier.

After Paramount rejected the film, Roddenberry sought to produce The God Thing as a novel in the late 1970s. He signed a deal with Bantam Books to publish it, but was given extensions because of his work; first on Phase II and then The Motion Picture. During this period, Star Trek actor Walter Koenig helped Roddenberry expand the novel. In 1991, shortly before Roddenberry's death, his assistant Susan Sackett rediscovered the work on the novel. She contacted Pocket Books, which wanted to publish it; discussions to hire Sackett and Fred Bronson to expand it to novel length were held, but negotiations stopped after Roddenberry's death and Sackett's dismissal from Star Trek: The Next Generation. Michael Jan Friedman was later engaged to expand the work but it went unpublished.

== Background ==
NBC canceled Star Trek following the third season in 1969, but the episodes were released into broadcast syndication where they were successful. Because of this success and fans' responses at science-fiction conventions held in honor of the series, Paramount Pictures soon sought to create a movie based on the series. By March 1972, series creator Gene Roddenberry said there was interest in a Star Trek feature film, and that the series could return to television on NBC.

== Plot ==
The five-year mission of Star Trek has finished and the crew has moved on from their postings on the starship Enterprise. Captain James T. Kirk has been promoted to Admiral, Doctor Leonard McCoy has left Starfleet to become a veterinarian, and other crew members have been given desk jobs. Engineer Montgomery Scott has become an alcoholic through boredom. Spock has returned to his home planet, Vulcan, where he was seeking to control the human half of his persona.

After an alien entity declaring itself to be God destroys spacecraft en route to Earth, the Enterprise is launched under the command of Admiral Kirk to engage the vessel. He re-assembles the former crew, including Spock, and sets out to intercept the alien. As they approach the entity, it transports a humanoid probe on board the Enterprise that takes a variety of forms—including that of Jesus. The crew determine that the being and its craft are from an alternate dimension and have been responsible for the creation of religion on numerous planets to teach their inhabitants its laws in a manner understandable at their points in development. The being is malfunctioning; the crew repair it and send it back to its own dimension.

== Production ==
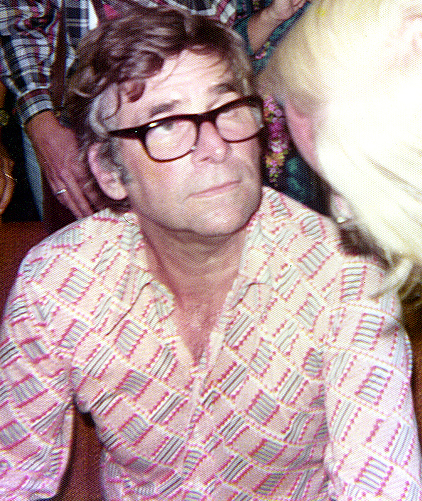
Gene Roddenberry in 1976

In May 1975, Roddenberry entered a development deal with Paramount, with principal photography intended to start on July 15, 1976, and a budget of $5 million. He started work on treatments; his first involved the formation of the Enterprise crew, including their training at Starfleet Academy and the formation of Starfleet, but this idea was never submitted to Paramount. His first major submitted script was The God Thing. A scene involving a discussion in which Spock's tutors describe religion on Earth worried the studio. The tutor says, "We have never really understood your Earth legend of gods. Particularly in that so many of your gods have said, 'You have to bow down on your bellies every seven days and worship me'. This seems to us like they are very insecure gods." Roddenberry completed the script on June 30; Paramount rejected it the following month. The studio was also unhappy with, and rejected, scripts by Robert Silverberg, Chris Knopt, Dick Simmons, and Theodore Sturgeon. Roddenberry blamed religious Paramount executives including Barry Diller for turning down The God Thing, a story that writer Jon Povill summarized as "God was a malfunctioning spaceship".

The production start date for the film was postponed to 1977, and Paramount brought in new staff. Jerry Isenberg was hired as executive producer, who hired British writers Bryant and Scott in September 1976 to begin work on a new treatment that became known as Star Trek: Planet of the Titans. After that failed, Roddenberry planned to take Star Trek back to television as the series Star Trek: Phase II, redeveloping The God Thing into the pilot episode of the series, "In Thy Image". After this too was canceled, the story was again redeveloped to become the film Star Trek: The Motion Picture.

=== Novelization ===
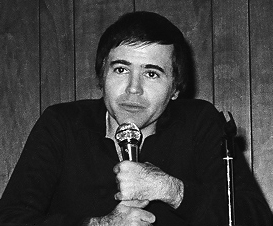
Walter Koenig (photographed in 1980) worked to expand Roddenberry's initial draft of the novelization.

Following the rejection of the script, Roddenberry planned to convert his treatment into a novel. After his assistant Susan Sackett showed him the manuscript of a novel that actor Walter Koenig had asked her to type, Roddenberry sought Koenig's collaboration on The God Thing. Roddenberry had already produced 68 pages after working on it for a month when he handed it to Koenig, who added another 83 in two months. Roddenberry received the changes enthusiastically, but a few weeks later Sackett informed Koenig that the project had been abandoned. In his 1997 autobiography Warped Factors, Koenig stated that he still had copies of the work he had completed on the book.

In the January 1977 issue of Starlog, Roddenberry said he was not sure when the novel would be complete, but confirmed that it would discuss the meaning of God. By March 1978, the novel was said to be half-completed. Publisher Bantam Books told Roddenberry it would wait until he finished production on Phase II to resume work on the novel. When later in 1978 that production turned into The Motion Picture, Bantam gave Roddenberry an extension because the novelization was thought to be a full-time effort.

In 1991, Sackett discovered a partly-completed manuscript while she researched documents for her book Inside Trek. This prompted her to suggest sending it to Pocket Books, which held the rights to Star Trek novels at the time, despite the prior agreement with Bantam. Roddenberry was not enthusiastic about the idea, but editor David Stern at Pocket Books was interested and wanted to know whether Sackett and fellow writer Fred Bronson would be able to expand and complete it. Contract negotiations for the work began in April 1991, during which time Sackett had a version re-typed because no electronic versions were available and the type on the existing printout was faint in places. The writers were dealing with Roddenberry's lawyer Leonard Maizlish, but discussions lasted over six months. Two days after Roddenberry's death on October 24, they were informed that work on the novel would not continue. Sackett said this may have been linked to her dismissal from the Star Trek: The Next Generation television series following Roddenberry's death. Pocket Books brought in Michael Jan Friedman to finish the work, but it was never published.

== Reception and legacy ==
The God Thing remains known to Star Trek fans because of comparisons to other works, such as the aforementioned Star Trek: The Motion Picture, in which an entity calling itself V'ger enters Federation space in search of its "creator," and the later Star Trek V: The Final Frontier where the crew encounter a messianic figure and an entity masquerading as God. Roddenberry opposed the plot of The Final Frontier, not wanting the film to be part of the overall canon for the franchise. Roddenberry's themes of interaction with religion and God have appeared elsewhere in the franchise.

Edward Gross described Roddenberry's rejection of The Final Frontier as "ironic" because of the similarity between that film and The God Thing. In his book, Jewish Themes in Star Trek, Rabbi Yonassan Gershom compared the two plots, saying they were different in their approaches. He said Roddenberry wanted to disprove God's existence in The God Thing, whereas William Shatner, who directed The Final Frontier, sought to take God seriously. This was partly due to the novelization of The Final Frontier, in which the original version of the scene was to show all manner of religious expression on the final showdown with the God-like figure in Sha-Ka-Ree. However, this scene was simplified for the film due to budget constraints.

== See also ==
- Star Trek (film series)

== Bibliography ==
- Engel, Joel (1994). Gene Roddenberry: The Myth and the Man Behind Star Trek. New York: Hyperion. ISBN 0-7868-6004-9.
- Gershom, Yonassan (2009). Jewish Themes in Star Trek. Raleigh, NC: Lulu Press. ISBN 978-0-557-04800-7.
- Greenberger, Robert (2012). Star Trek: The Complete Unauthorised History. Minneapolis: Voyageur Press. ISBN 978-0-7603-4359-3.
- Hughes, David (2008). The Greatest Science Fiction Movies Never Made. London: Titan Books. ISBN 978-1-84576-755-6.
- Koenig, Walter (1997). Warped Factors. Dallas, TX: Taylor Publishing. ISBN 0-87833-991-4.
- Reeves-Stevens, Judith; Reeves-Stevens, Garfield (1997). Star Trek: Phase II: The Lost Series (2nd ed.). New York: Pocket Books. ISBN 0-671-56839-6.
- Sackett, Susan (2002). Inside Trek. Tulsa: Hawk Publishing. ISBN 1-930709-42-0.
- Sackett, Susan; Roddenberry, Gene (1980). The Making of Star Trek: The Motion Picture. New York: Pocket Books. ISBN 0-671-25181-3.
