= I Am Spock =

Leonard Nimoy's second autobiography

- Author: Leonard Nimoy
- Genre: Autobiography
- Publisher: Hyperion Books
- Publication date: October 1995
- Media type: Print in hardcover and paperback; Audiobook on Cassette
- Pages: 342 (First edition hardcover)
- ISBN: 978-0-7868-6182-8 (First Edition Hardcover)
- OCLC: 32822493
- Dewey Decimal: 791.45/028/092 B 20
- LC Class: PN2287.N55 A3 1995
- Preceded by: I Am Not Spock

I Am Spock is the second volume of actor and director Leonard Nimoy's autobiography. The book was published in 1995, four years after the release of the last Star Trek motion picture starring the entire original cast, and covers the majority of Nimoy's time with Star Trek in general and Mr. Spock in particular. The book's title was a reference to the first volume of his autobiography, I Am Not Spock, which had been published in 1975. At that time, Nimoy had sought to distance his own personality from that of the character of Spock, although he nonetheless remained proud of his time on the show. Negative fan reaction to the title gave Nimoy the idea for the title of the second volume.

== Synopsis ==
In his second autobiography, Nimoy explains that the title of the first book had been his idea, over the objections of his publishers. He had not anticipated the problem of people reading the title without reading the book. In reality, his feelings toward Spock had not changed at all in the intervening years. On the contrary, Nimoy explains in this book that Spock has always been a part of him.

This duality is explored and taken to extremes throughout the book. Indeed, the book's foreword is written by Mr. Spock himself, in the form of a letter the Vulcan writes to Leonard Nimoy, to express confusion over the highly illogical title. Throughout the book, Nimoy frequently has conversations with his other half, as he explores the choices and decisions he has made throughout his life, and how those choices have been affected by a certain calm logical voice in the back of his mind.

While the focus of the book is on Nimoy's Star Trek career, he also takes time to explore his other works, including directing and theatre acting. Memorable stories include his being forced to tell an actress she needed to redo a highly emotional scene because of a crew member's mistake, and how directing Star Trek III: The Search for Spock and Star Trek IV: The Voyage Home led to Hollywood giving him a shot at directing Three Men and a Baby (1987), which went on to be the highest-grossing film in the United States of that year. He also mentions his work producing and directing the UPN television series Deadly Games.

On the topic of Spock's future, Nimoy notes that the Star Trek franchise shows no sign of dying, and that as far as he is concerned, Spock is still alive and well working on Romulus. (Note: At the time of publication Spock was last seen on Romulus in the two-part episode "Unification" of Star Trek: The Next Generation) (Note: Nimoy played Spock again (alongside a younger Spock played by Zachary Quinto) in the 2009 film Star Trek and the 2013 film Star Trek Into Darkness, both directed by J. J. Abrams.)

== Reception ==
Anita Gates of The New York Times praised his "pleasant, conversational writing style" and said "his affection for the Spock experience rings very true". Publishers Weekly wrote: "Nimoy's admirers may find this fairly impersonal memoir disappointing; it touches only tangentially on the author's private life. But this is an intelligent and entertaining look at an actor's engagement with a character who "seemed to take on an existence of his own.""
