= Susan Sackett =

American author and screenwriter (born 1943)

- Born: December 18, 1943 (age 82); New York City, U.S.
- Education: University of Florida (BA, MEd)
- Occupations: Author; screenwriter; humanist celebrant
- Partner: Gene Roddenberry (1975–1991; his death)
- Writing career
- Genres: Film and television; biography
- Subjects: Star Trek, Hollywood

Susan Sackett (born December 18, 1943) is an American author and screenwriter, best known for her involvement in the Star Trek franchise.

== Early life and early career ==
Susan Sackett was born into a Jewish family in New York City on December 18, 1943. She was raised in Connecticut and graduated from Hillhouse High School in New Haven. She received BA (1964) and MEd (1965) degrees from the University of Florida. After teaching elementary school in Miami for two years, she moved to Los Angeles, where she taught for a short time. She quit her teaching job to work in the entertainment industry, spending four years with the National Broadcasting Company (NBC) as a publicity assistant and commercial coordinator.

== Writing career ==
In 1974, she began an association with Star Trek creator Gene Roddenberry, serving as his personal executive assistant for over 17 years until his death in October 1991. She also served as his production assistant on Star Trek: The Motion Picture and worked closely with him on the next five Star Trek films. In addition, she served as production associate during the first five seasons of the television series Star Trek: The Next Generation.

Sackett and her writing partner, Fred Bronson, wrote the TNG episodes "Ménage à Troi" (teleplay) and "The Game" (story credit only). Additionally, while working full-time as Roddenberry's assistant, Sackett wrote three books about Star Trek: Letters to Star Trek, Star Trek Speaks!, and The Making of Star Trek: The Motion Picture (with Roddenberry).

Another book, Star Trek: The First 25 Years, also co-authored with Roddenberry, was purchased by Pocket Books, although not published due to the publisher's legal entanglements. Instead, it became the basis of the 1994 book, Star Trek: 'Where No One Has Gone Before': A History in Pictures, by J. M. Dillard. In the fall of 1993, Billboard Books published Prime-Time Hits, her third Billboard book, and Hollywood Sings! was released in 1995.

In 2002, her autobiography, Inside Trek: My Secret Life with Star Trek Creator Gene Roddenberry (Hawk Publishing Group) was released, detailing her decade-and-a-half-long romantic and intimate involvement with her mentor. In 2013, Amazon published a revised and updated eBook version for Kindle.

She is author of other books also related to the film and television industry, including You Can Be a Game Show Contestant and Win! (Dell Books, 1982; co-written with Cheryl Blythe). Following her own advice as outlined in the book, in 1986 Sackett went on Jeopardy!, ultimately winning $6,400 in cash and a trip to Honolulu. (These shows aired as the first two games of the third season, September 8 and 9, 1986.)

Sackett and Blythe also co-authored Say Goodnight, Gracie! – The Story of Burns and Allen (E. P. Dutton, 1986; paperback edition, Prima Publishing, 1989). A revised and updated eBook version for Kindle was released by Amazon in 2016.

In 1990, The Hollywood Reporter Book of Box Office Hits was published by Billboard Publications, with an updated and revised version released in 1995.

== Humanism ==
Although raised as a Reform Jew, Sackett considers herself a secular humanist and has been active in Humanism since 1989. She was introduced to secular humanism by Roddenberry after finding a copy of Asimov's Guide to the Bible on his desk. "I discovered that I was in line with this way of thinking without knowing there was a name for it". The two began attending conventions together and met prominent skeptics such as James Randi. From 2000 to 2010, she was president of Humanist Society of Greater Phoenix. For 13 years, she served on the board of directors of the American Humanist Association. She is also a member of Mensa International, the Academy of Television Arts & Sciences (ATAS), and the Writers Guild of America (WGA).

Since 2001, Sackett has been a certified humanist celebrant and performs naming ceremonies, weddings, and funeral ceremonies without traditional religious undertones.

In 2011, she was elected to the board of directors of Humanists International (formerly IHEU), serving six years on that board.

She resides in Arizona.

== Books ==
- Inside Trek: My Secret Life with Star Trek Creator Gene Roddenberry, (Hawk Publishing Group, 2002),ISBN 978-1930709423, ASIN B00BPEJ84O
- Hollywood Sings!, (Billboard Books, 1995) ISBN 978-0823076239
- Prime-Time Hits, (Billboard Books, 1993) ISBN 978-0823083923
- Star Trek: The First 25 Years, (with Gene Roddenberry, purchased by Pocket Books but not published, 1991)
- The Hollywood Reporter Book of Box Office Hits, (Billboard Books, 1990) ISBN 978-0823075492
- Say Goodnight, Gracie! – The Story of Burns and Allen, (with Cheryl Blythe, E.P. Dutton, 1986); paperback edition (Prima Books, 1989) ASIN B01D3X6R34
- You Can Be a Game Show Contestant and Win! (with Cheryl Blythe, Dell Books, 1982) ISBN 978-0440598213
- The Making of Star Trek: The Motion Picture (with Gene Roddenberry, Pocket Books, 1980) ISBN 978-0671251819
- Star Trek Speaks! (with Fred and Stan Goldstein, Pocket Books, 1979) ISBN 978-0671790912
- Letters to Star Trek (Ballantine Books, 1977) ISBN 978-0345255228
