= Personal life of Gene Roddenberry =

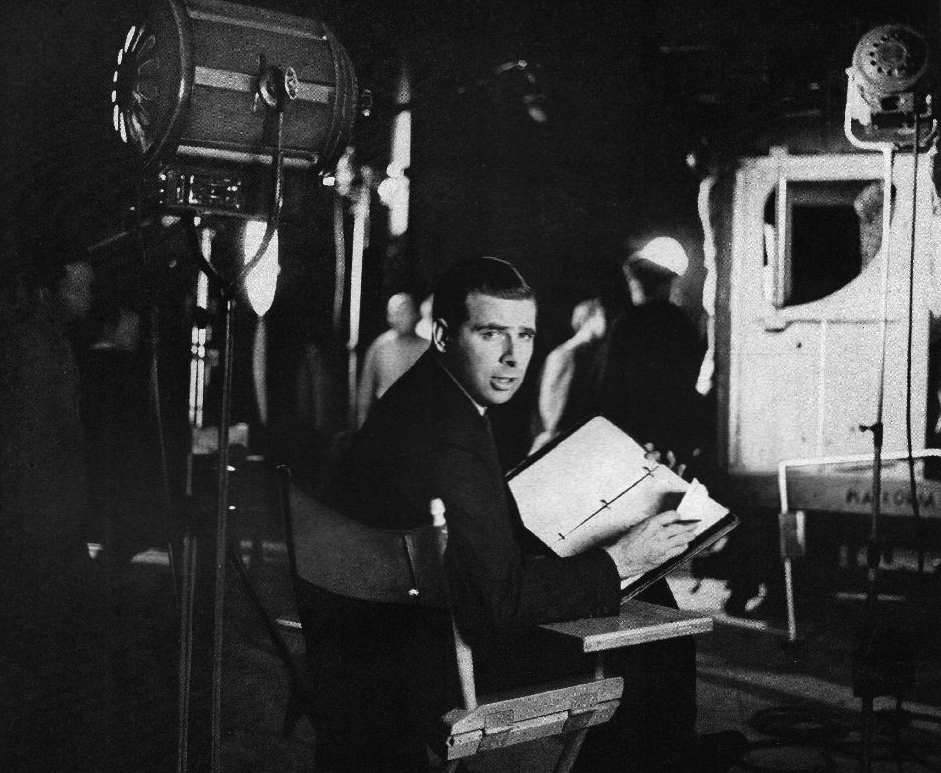
Gene Roddenberry appearing in an advertisement for Mutual of New York in 1961

Eugene Wesley "Gene" Roddenberry (August 19, 1921 – October 24, 1991) was an American television screenwriter, producer and futurist best remembered for creating the original Star Trek television series. While at Los Angeles City College, he entered into a relationship with Eileen-Anita Rexroat, whom he went on to marry on June 20, 1942, before his deployment in the United States Army Air Corps during World War II. The couple had two daughters together, Darleen Anita and Dawn Allison. He joined the Los Angeles Police Department, and during this time he was known to have had affairs with secretarial staff, thus endangering his marriage.

He went on to become a television producer and became known as a womanizer. During the production of his series The Lieutenant, he entered into relationships with Nichelle Nichols and Majel Barrett, seeking to have an open relationship with both women. Nichols has since said that they broke up after this, but she was later found more than once in Roddenberry's office on Star Trek either nude or partly clothed. By the time he worked on that series, his relationship with Barrett was well known, and they openly shared an apartment near Desilu Studios where it was filmed. He paid his secretary extra to provide alibis to both his wife and Barrett when he was with other women. His frequent relationships with actresses were well known, and he boasted of late night casting sessions. He sought to divorce Eileen in 1968, but afterwards felt that he did not get his fair share of assets.

Barrett and Roddenberry were married in Japan on August 6, 1969, in a Shinto ceremony. His divorce was not yet finalized, so he and Barrett had a second ceremony at their home in California on December 29. However, Roddenberry continued to have relationships with other women. The couple had a son, Eugene Jr., who was born on February 5, 1974. Roddenberry and Barrett remained married until his death in 1991.

== First marriage ==
While at Los Angeles City College, Roddenberry began dating Eileen-Anita Rexroat, who was two years younger. She was initially uninterested in him, but he persevered. Their first date was a bonfire on the beach. Her parents disapproved of Roddenberry and saw him as the common son of a policeman. They became engaged before Roddenberry left Los Angeles during his military service in the United States Army Air Corps. At the start of June 1942, he was moved back to Kelly Field for advanced training and made plans to marry Eileen, initially considering a double wedding but the other fiancée changed her mind and the plan was cancelled. Roddenberry applied for a marriage license on June 13, and they were married seven days later at the chapel at Kelly Field, San Antonio, before Chaplain George W. Shardt. Eileen was not fond of the heat in Texas and sometimes stripped nude when in the apartment. Shortly afterwards, Roddenberry was posted to the South Pacific, not returning permanently until October 1943.

After he left the military in July 1945, the couple moved briefly to Jamaica, Long Island when Roddenberry became a pilot for Pan American World Airways, before moving onto River Edge, New Jersey. After his survival of the crash of Pan Am Flight 121 in June 1947, Roddenberry returned home and the couple's first child, Darleen Anita, was born in Hackensack, New Jersey on April 4, 1948. After he resigned from Pan Am on May 15, the family moved to California so that he might pursue his dream of becoming a screenwriter. They first lived with his parents in Temple City, California, and he became a police officer. During his time working in the Los Angeles Police Department, Roddenberry had affairs with secretarial staff, and it was well known in the Department that he was having marital problems. He confided in Don Ingalls that he and Eileen were unhappy, but despite this, a second daughter, Dawn Allison, was born in 1954.

After being introduced to television executives through connections at the LAPD, he began working part-time as a writer during the mid-1950s although found the time pressures increasingly difficult. He resigned from the force on June 7, 1956, after being offered a full-time writing role on The West Point Story. Eileen disliked his writing career, once telling a friend that she wished he had not changed careers, although she enjoyed the increased money and the other perks that came with it. Gary Lockwood, star of Roddenberry's The Lieutenant, described her as being "strait-laced" but "very attractive". Herbert F. Solow, later producer for Star Trek, explained that she felt that the circles that Roddenberry was running in were going to ultimately cost them their marriage. Sam Rolfe, who was Roddenberry's boss on Have Gun – Will Travel, said once Roddenberry had transitioned from writer to producer, "Let's face it, Gene played around a lot after that".

== Nichelle Nichols and Majel Barrett ==
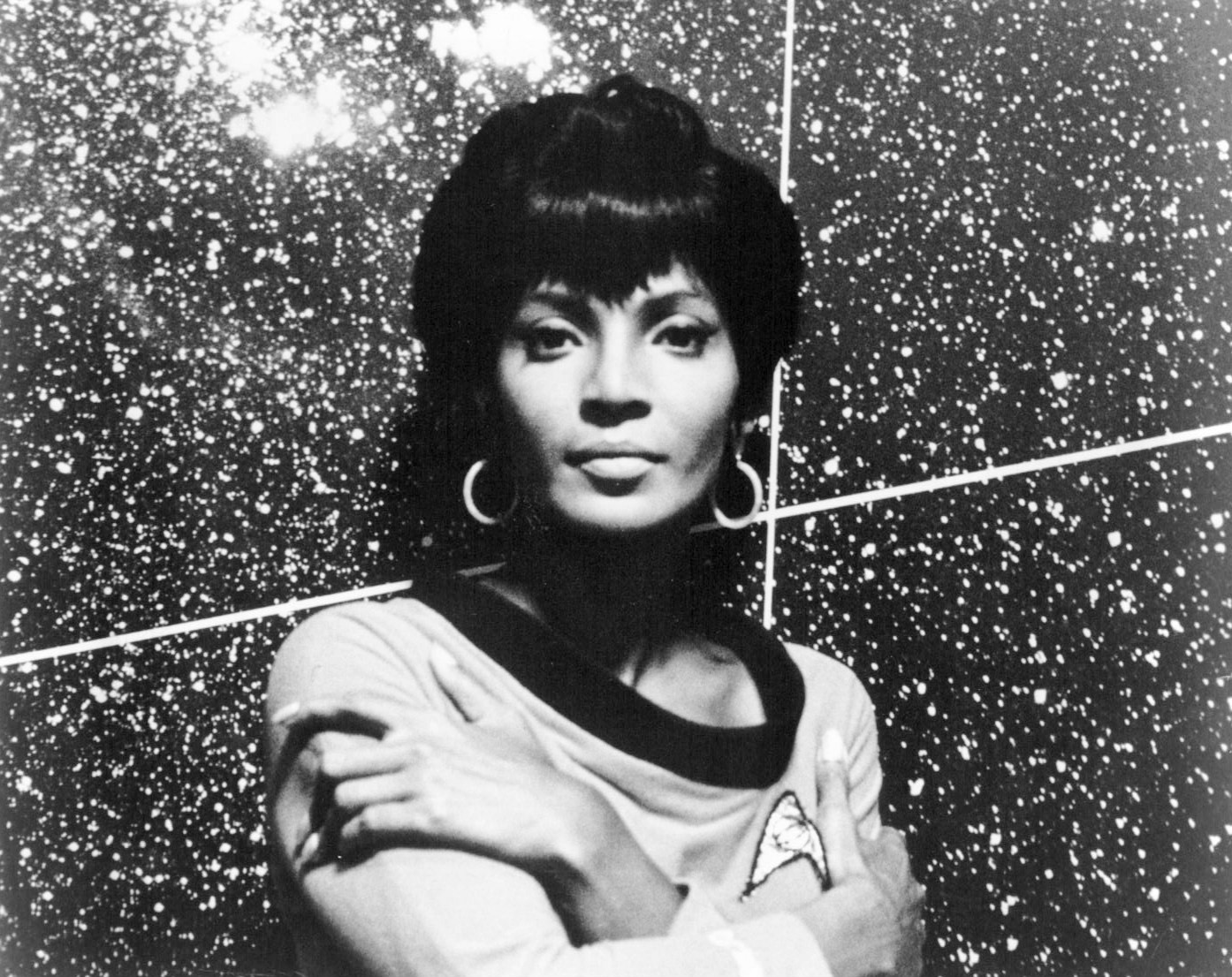
Roddenberry had a relationship with Nichelle Nichols (pictured in 1967) prior to work on Star Trek.

Before his work on Star Trek, Roddenberry began relationships with both Nichelle Nichols and Majel Barrett. After he met Nichols when she was cast in "To Set It Right," an episode of The Lieutenant, he began a friendship that lasted for the rest of his life. During the early period, prior to Star Trek, they entered into a romantic liaison that she described as falling in love. At the same time, after meeting Barrett during the filming of the episode "In the Highest Tradition", they became friends and soon entered into a relationship. After several months he introduced Nichols to Barrett. At the time, Roddenberry wanted to remain in an open relationship with both women, but Nichols, recognizing Barrett's devotion to him, ended the affair as she did not want to be "the other woman to the other woman". Barrett and Nichols had met previously when Nichols auditioned for The Singing Nun.

Nichols wrote about their relationship only after Roddenberry's death, in her autobiography Beyond Uhura. She was concerned about their interracial relationship becoming public knowledge, and its potential impact on Roddenberry's career. They discussed it on several occasions but he maintained that he did not care about possible consequences for him. Barrett was not convinced that Roddenberry was going to leave his wife at the time, later explaining that he was troubled because he had made a promise to Eileen and took the commitment seriously. By the time he started on the series, Nichols said that they were only good friends as his involvement with Barrett continued. However, during the production of the first season, writer Ken Kolb entered Roddenberry's office to wish him a happy birthday and found Nichols there, naked and under the desk, also waiting for Roddenberry. During the third season, production assistant Ed Milkis entered Roddenberry's office to find him and Nichols. She was wearing only a letterman sweater.

=== Star Trek and divorce ===
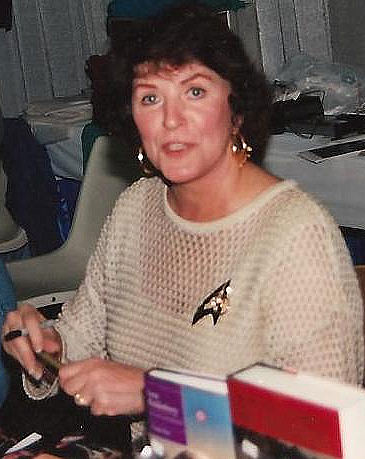
Majel Barrett (pictured in 2006) first met Gene Roddenberry while he was working on pilots for Screen Gems.

As work began on "The Cage", Barrett and Roddenberry's relationship was out in the open, and they invited Solow to join them for drinks. He turned them down and tried to talk Roddenberry out of continuing with the affair, but was pushed on the issue as Roddenberry wanted to discuss casting Barrett in Star Trek as Number One. Solow spoke to NBC's executives about it, who were shocked as they remembered Barrett as Roddenberry's girlfriend from her time on set during filming of The Lieutenant. Deciding not to upset Roddenberry during the early stages of production, they agreed to the casting.

After "The Cage" failed to lead to a series, a second pilot, entitled "Where No Man Has Gone Before" was produced. Andrea Dromm was cast as Yeoman Smith. Director James Goldstone overheard Roddenberry telling someone that Dromm had been specifically hired because he wanted to have sex with her. She later said that she never had a problem with him, and thought he was "a nice man". Stories of sexually related pranks began to spread among the crew, one involving the new story editor, John D. F. Black. Roddenberry had asked him to interview a new actress, who promptly came on to Black, stripping down to her underwear before sliding onto his lap. At that point, Roddenberry burst in demanding to know what was going on – the woman was Barrett.

By the opening weeks of Star Trek, Roddenberry and Barrett had an apartment together near Desilu Studios where the series was filmed, leading Jerry Sohl to believe that Roddenberry was already in the process of divorcing his wife. He created the role of Christine Chapel for her, but felt that she needed to be hidden from the NBC executives. So she dyed her hair blonde, and used the name "Majel Barrett" instead of "M. Leigh Hudec" as she had in "The Cage". This was unsuccessful and the executives recognised her immediately. Barrett was not the only woman that Roddenberry was involved with during the production of the series, and he boasted to crew members about "late night casting sessions" with potential actresses, and once asked producer Robert H. Justman to cover for him by telling his wife that they were working late when in fact Solow was heading home to his family. The other producers sought to ignore Roddenberry's ongoing dalliances, but Justman drew a line at acting as his alibi.

Instead, Roddenberry gave his secretary, Penny Unger, a pay raise in exchange for telling both Eileen and Barrett that he was in meetings when required. She also provided early warning to Roddenberry and Barrett whenever Eileen arrived on set. Grace Lee Whitney, who played Janice Rand during the first half season, was suggested by Solow and Justman in their book Inside Star Trek: The Real Story to have been in a relationship with Roddenberry prior to Star Trek. She denied this in her book, The Longest Trek: My Tour of the Galaxy, saying that before she appeared on the series that they had only a professional relationship. But during Star Trek, he made multiple passes at her, as well as remarks involving innuendos and double entendres.

The stories about Roddenberry's womanizing grew among the cast and crew of Star Trek, and he appeared to revel in each new tale. He was intimate with various women in his office, where they could easily be seen through the windows, with one particular instance being witnessed by both Black and Harlan Ellison. For his birthday during the second season, a party was arranged in his office with nearly naked dancers. The head of Desilu Studios, Lucille Ball, heard about the incident and was outraged. She sent her personal publicist, Howard McClay, to speak to Justman. He in turn spoke to Roddenberry, who Justman felt enjoyed the notoriety gained.

The separation and divorce after twenty-six years of marriage, particularly with my Southern family traditions and concerns over the sanctity of personal contracts, was a traumatic experience. I realize now it was much more difficult than it should have been. Relationships, like people, can die and while they can be properly mourned, it seems to me that they should have a proper burial at the appropriate time. I wish I had realized that all the sooner.

— Gene Roddenberry, Letter to Isaac Asimov, April 1972

Roddenberry became involved in the casting of actresses for the series, seeking for them to have both acting talent as well as being good looking. Following the pressures of the first two years of his series, Roddenberry found that he had very little time for his family. He had planned to divorce Eileen after the first season of the show, but when it was renewed, he delayed doing so fearing that he did not have enough time to deal with both the divorce and Star Trek. His oldest daughter, Darleen Anita, was married on July 27, 1968, to William Luther "Bill" Lewis.

Roddenberry sought to embarrass Eileen at the reception by arranging for an ex-girlfriend to attend with a neighbor. After they recited impromptu poetry at each other in the middle of the reception, he explained loudly how he had spent a year seducing the woman during his marriage. Two weeks later on August 9, Roddenberry moved out of the family home. Barrett later remarked that she went and stayed with him at the Century Plaza Hotel, and stayed by his side for the following twenty-three years. The divorce was not easy, and Roddenberry felt that he did not get his fair share of the assets and that he never received some promised items such as his war medals.

=== Second marriage ===
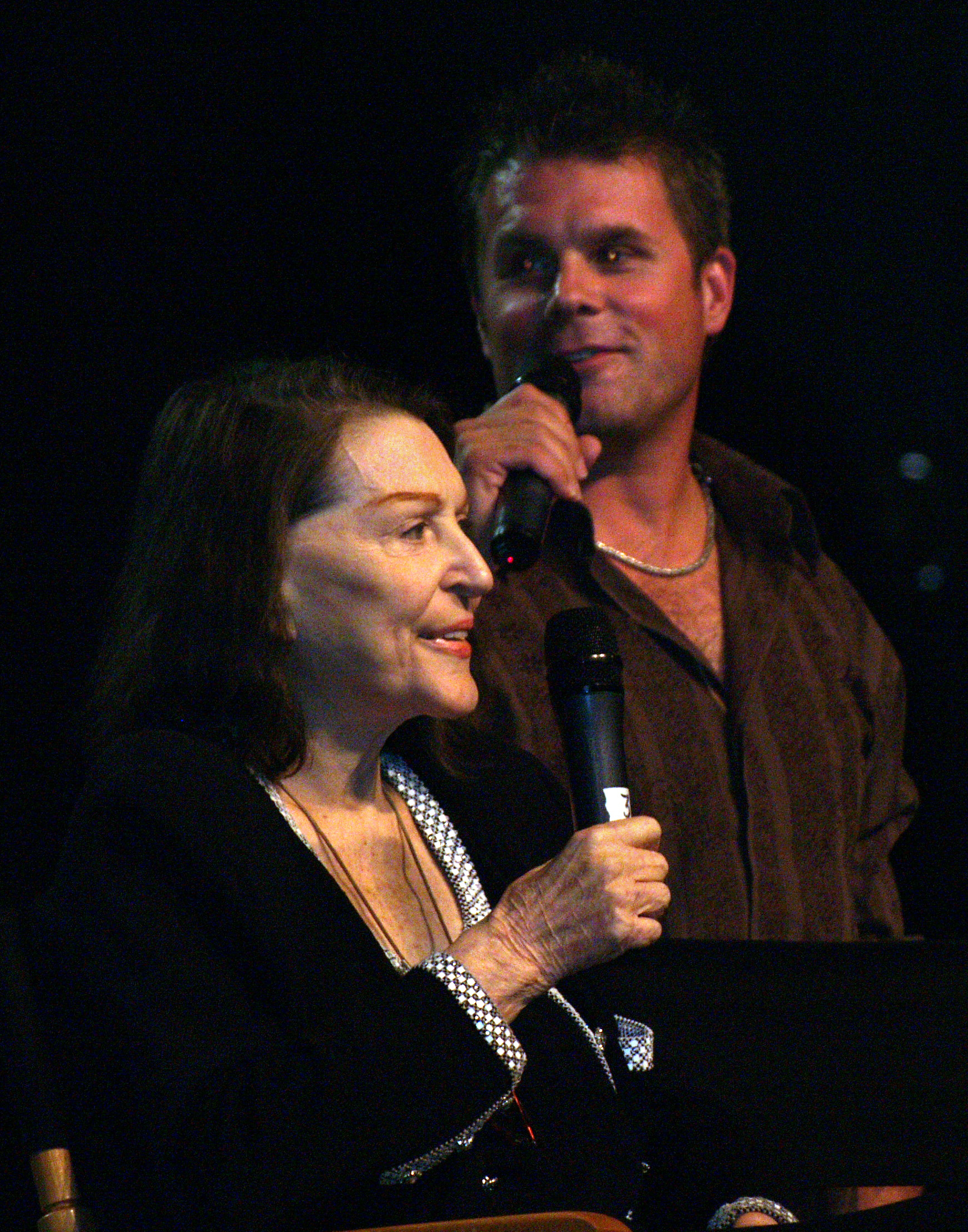
Majel Barrett-Roddenberry and Rod Roddenberry in 2008

Following his work on Star Trek, Roddenberry sought to produce a television movie based on Tarzan. But the studio passed on the project, as they felt that he had written the character as too sexual for broadcast on TV in the late 1960s. In 1969, while scouting locations in Japan for MGM, Roddenberry claimed that he realized that he missed Barrett and proposed to her by telephone. According to Solow, Roddenberry traveled to Japan with the intention of marrying Barrett. She had a passport and joined Roddenberry in Tokyo, where they were married in a Shinto ceremony on August 6, 1969. Roddenberry had considered it "sacrilegious" to use an American minister in Japan, and the ceremony was attended by two Shinto priests as well as maids of honor. Roddenberry and Barrett both wore kimono, and spent their honeymoon touring Japan. He continued to have liaisons with other women, telling his friends that while in Japan he had an encounter with a masseuse about a week after he was married.

The new marriage was not legally binding, as his divorce from Eileen was not yet final. This was resolved two days after his divorce was complete, and on December 29, a small ceremony was held at their home followed by a reception for family and friends. Despite this, the couple continued to celebrate August 6 as their wedding anniversary. His young daughter, Dawn, decided to live with him and Barrett, and together they moved to a new house in Beverly Hills during the following October. He began work on the film Pretty Maids All in a Row, based on a book which he felt was vulgar. The volume of nude scenes in the movie was new to MGM, and proved difficult due to requirements for those scenes to be agreed in written contracts with the relevant actresses.

Roddenberry and Barrett had a son together, Eugene Jr., commonly referred to as Rod Roddenberry, in February 1974. They remained married for the rest of Roddenberry's life, and Barrett was at his side when he died on October 24, 1991, at a doctor's office in Santa Monica, California. From 1975 until his death, Roddenberry maintained an extramarital relationship with his executive assistant, Susan Sackett.

Rod had not followed his parents' work on Star Trek, leaving him to question what it was all about after his father's death. This exploration eventually resulted in him producing the 2011 documentary, Trek Nation.
