= 1968 in television =

The year 1968 in television involved some significant events. Below is a list of television-related events in 1968.

== Events ==
- January 20 – Houston defeats UCLA 71–69 at the Houston Astrodome on the TVS Television Network in what is billed as "The Game of the Century"; the first prime-time national broadcast of men's college basketball.
- January 27 – The Lennon Sisters make their final appearance on The Lawrence Welk Show on ABC (United States).
- January 31 – Turkey's first national TV channel TRT 1 is opened.
- February 6 – The Xth Olympic Winter Games in Grenoble, France are the first Olympics to be fully broadcast in color for the U.S. market by ABC.
- February 19 – National Educational Television in the United States begins airing preschool show Mister Rogers' Neighborhood nationally; it runs until 2001.
- February 28 – Influential American news reporter Walter Cronkite comments on primetime television "It is increasingly clear to this reporter that the only rational way out [of the Vietnam War] then will be to negotiate, not as victors, but as an honorable people who lived up to their pledge to defend democracy, and did the best they could", which influences US President Johnson not to seek another term.
- April 2
  - NBC in the US broadcasts a television special in which white British singer Petula Clark appears with black performer Harry Belafonte as her guest. An innocent, affectionate gesture between the two during recording of a song (Clark touches Belafonte on the arm) has prompted an objection from a representative from the show's sponsor (Chrysler Corporation) due to the difference in their races, but NBC airs the performance.
  - RAI in Italy broadcasts the first episode of the miniseries La famiglia Benvenuti (The Benvenuti family), by Alfredo Giannetti, with Enrico Maria Salerno and Valeria Valeri, about the life of the Italian middle class. The show, innovative at this time, is received well by the public and critics alike, and the child actor Giusva Fioravanti (later infamous right-wing terrorist) becomes a star.
- April 4 – Singer James Brown appears on national television in an attempt to calm feelings of anger in the United States following the assassination of Reverend Doctor Martin Luther King Jr.
- April 6 – The Eurovision Song Contest 1968 is held at the Royal Albert Hall in London, the first to be televised in colour.
- April 27 – Jordan Television, as predecessor of Jordan Radio and Television Corporation (JRTV-One), a first official television broadcasting service start in Jordan, is launched in Amman.
- May 2 – The Israel Broadcasting Authority commences television broadcasts.
- May 4 – Mary Hopkin performs on the British TV talent show Opportunity Knocks. Hopkin catches the attention of model Twiggy, who recommends her to Beatle Paul McCartney. McCartney soon signs Hopkin to Apple Records.
- May 10 – The government of France issues an order prohibiting the state broadcaster ORTF from televising the May 68 student demonstrations in Paris, but radio reports are permitted.
- May 20
  - The Children's Television Workshop (CTW), later known as Sesame Workshop, is founded in the United States by Joan Ganz Cooney and Lloyd Morrisett as a nonprofit organization for production of educational children's programs. It will launch Sesame Street next year.
  - Harlech (which will become HTV in 1970) starts its dual service for Wales and the West Country in the UK, replacing the interim ITSWW, which had replaced TWW.
- May 24 – President Charles de Gaulle appears on French television and makes a plea to viewers for help in ending the country's May 68 strikes and unrest.
- June 2 – The first cricket match to be televised in colour by the BBC in the UK, Surrey v International Cavaliers held at Cheam Cricket Club Ground. The game attracts 8,000 people.
- June 14 – Rosemary Prinz, one of the first big soap opera stars, is written out of As the World Turns in a less-than-amicable departure.
- August 20–21 – Warsaw Pact invasion of Czechoslovakia. Events are televised live across Europe.
- October 13 – Actress Bea Benaderet of the popular CBS-TV sitcom Petticoat Junction dies of lung cancer at the age of 62 shortly after the start of the popular program's sixth season.
- October 14 – First live television broadcast from a spacecraft in orbit, during the Apollo 7 mission. There are six broadcasts during the eleven-day mission.
- October 21–25 – Joan Crawford makes a guest appearance for five episodes on the soap opera The Secret Storm, filling in for her ailing daughter, Christina. Joan slurs her lines and appears to be intoxicated during the tapings.
- November 17 – "Heidi Game": NBC breaks away from a pro football game to air a TV movie adaptation of Heidi, sparking furious protest. After the break away, the Oakland Raiders score two touchdowns to defeat the New York Jets, in the final minute of play.
- November 17 - WABC-TV debuts the Eyewitness News format on behalf of news director Al Primo.
- November 22 – Kirk and Uhura's kiss: William Shatner and Nichelle Nichols share the first significant interracial kiss on US television in the Star Trek episode "Plato's Stepchildren".
- December 3 – The 50-minute television special Elvis (sponsored by sewing machine manufacturer The Singer Company), taped in June with a live audience in Burbank, California, airs on NBC in the United States marking the comeback of Elvis Presley after 7 years during which the legendary rock and roll musician's career has centered on the movie industry. Concluding with the premiere of "If I Can Dream", it is not only the highest rated television show for the week of broadcast, but the highest rated television special of the year. Its original broadcast is followed by a Brigitte Bardot special.
- December 24 – Apollo 8 broadcasts to the Earth, relaying a report that there is a Santa Claus and reading a passage from the Book of Genesis.

Also in 1968

- Nearly 200 million households now own television sets, 78 million of which are in the US.
- The Guiding Light and Search for Tomorrow expand to 30 minutes.
- The last round-screen color TV sets are produced by all American manufacturers.

== Programs/programmes ==
- American Bandstand (1952–1989)
- Another World (1964–1999)
- As the World Turns (1956–2010)
- Bewitched (1964–1972)
- Blue Peter (UK) (1958–present)
- Bonanza (1959–1973)
- Bozo the Clown (1949–present)
- Candid Camera (1948–present)
- Captain Kangaroo (1955–1984)
- Come Dancing (UK) (1949–1995)
- Coronation Street (UK) (1960–present)
- Crossroads (UK) (1964–1988, 2001–2003)
- Daniel Boone (1964–1970)
- Dark Shadows (1966–1971)
- Days of Our Lives (1965–present)
- Dixon of Dock Green (UK) (1955–1976)
- Do Not Adjust Your Set (1967–1969)
- Doctor Who (UK) (1963–1989, 1996, 2005–present)
- Face the Nation (1954–present)
- Family Affair (1966–1971)
- Four Corners (Australia) (1961–present)
- General Hospital (1963–present)
- Get Smart (1965–1970)
- Gomer Pyle, U.S.M.C. (1964–1970)
- Grandstand (UK) (1958–2007)
- Green Acres (1965–1971)
- Gunsmoke (1955–1975)
- Hallmark Hall of Fame (1951–present)
- Here's Lucy (1968–1974)
- Hogan's Heroes (1965–1971)
- I Dream of Jeannie (1965–1970)
- Ironside (1967–1975)
- I Spy (1965-1968)
- It's Academic (1961–present)
- Jeopardy! (1964–1975, 1984–present)
- Love is a Many Splendored Thing (1967–1973)
- Love of Life (1951–1980)
- Mannix (1967–1975)
- Match Game (1962–1969, 1973–1984, 1990–1991, 1998–1999)
- Meet the Press (1947–present)
- Mission: Impossible (1966–1973)
- Mister Rogers' Neighborhood (1968–2001)
- My Three Sons (1960–1972)
- Opportunity Knocks (UK) (1956–1978)
- Panorama (UK) (1953–present)
- Petticoat Junction (1963–1970)
- Peyton Place (1964–1969)
- Play School (1966–present)
- Search for Tomorrow (1951–1986)
- Spider-Man (1967–1970)
- Star Trek (1966–1969)
- That Girl (1966–1971)
- The Andy Griffith Show (1960–1968, direct spinoff Mayberry RFD premiered on September 23, and ran until 1971)
- The Avengers (UK) (1961–1969)
- The Banana Splits (1968–1970)
- The Beverly Hillbillies (1962–1971)
- The Carol Burnett Show (1967–1978)
- The Dean Martin Show (1965–1974)
- The Doctors (1963–1982)
- The Ed Sullivan Show (1948–1971)
- The Edge of Night (1956–1984)
- The Flying Nun (1967–1970)
- The Good Old Days (UK) (1953–1983)
- The Guiding Light (1952–2009)
- The Hollywood Palace (1964–1970)
- The Late Late Show (Ireland) (1962–present)
- The Lawrence Welk Show (1955–1982)
- The Lucy Show (1962–1968)
- The Mike Douglas Show (1961–1981)
- The Money Programme (UK) (1966–present)
- The Mothers-in-Law (1967–1969)
- The Newlywed Game (1966–1974)
- The Saint (UK) (1962–1969)
- The Secret Storm (1954–1974)
- The Sky at Night (UK) (1957–present)
- The Smothers Brothers Comedy Hour (1967–1969)
- The Today Show (1952–present)
- The Tonight Show Starring Johnny Carson (1962–1992)
- The Wednesday Play (UK) (1964–1970)
- This Is Your Life (UK) (1955–2003)
- Tom and Jerry (1965–1972, 1975–1977, 1980–1982)
- Top of the Pops (UK) (1964–2006)
- Truth or Consequences (1950–1988)
- TRT 1 Foreign films day (Turkey) (1968–present)
- TRT 1 Turkish films day (Turkey) (1968–present)
- Walt Disney's Wonderful World of Color (1961 – July 1971)
- What the Papers Say (UK) (1956–present)
- World of Sport (UK) (1965–1985)
- Z-Cars (UK) (1962–1978)

=== Debuts ===
- January 1 – Vremya (Вре́мя, "Time") in the Soviet Union (1964–1991, 1994–present)
- January 5 – Gardeners' World on BBC1 in the UK (1968–present)
- January 22 – Rowan & Martin's Laugh-In on NBC (1968–1973)
- February 19 – Mister Rogers' Neighborhood on National Educational Television (1968–2001)
- April – Audubon Wildlife Theatre on CBC (1968–1974)
- May 18 – The Prisoner has its U.S. premiere on CBS
- July 5 – The Expert on BBC2 in the UK (1968–1976)
- July 15 – One Life to Live (created by Agnes Nixon) on ABC (1968–2012, 2013–present)
- July 30 – Magpie on ITV in the UK (1968–1980)
- July 31 – Popular sitcom Dad's Army run on BBC1 in the UK (1968–1977)
- September – What's My Line in first-run syndication (1968–1975)
- September 14
  - The Archie Show on CBS Saturday Morning (1968–1969)
  - The Bugs Bunny/Road Runner Hour and on CBS Saturday Morning (1968–1971; 1975–1985; known as The Bugs Bunny/Road Runner Show from 1978 to 1985)
  - Wacky Races on CBS Saturday Morning (1968-1969)
- September 17 – Julia on NBC (1968–1971)
- September 21 – Adam-12 on NBC (1968–1975)
- September 22 – Land of the Giants on ABC (1968–1970)
- September 23
  - Here's Lucy on CBS (1968–1974)
  - Mayberry R.F.D. on CBS (1968–1971)
- September 24
  - The Doris Day Show on CBS (1968–1973)
  - The Mod Squad on ABC (1968–1973)
  - 60 Minutes (1968–present) on CBS
- September 25 – Here Come the Brides on ABC (1968–1970)
- September 26 – Hawaii Five-O on CBS (1968–1980)
- September 29 – Fabeltjeskrant on NOS (1968–1989)

=== Ending this year ===
Date	Show	Debut
January 15	The Man from U.N.C.L.E.	1964
January 20	Birdman and the Galaxy Trio	1967
February 4	The Prisoner (UK)	1967
February 7	Cliff Dexter (West Germany)	1966
March 6	Lost in Space	1965
March 11	The Lucy Show	1962
March 14	Batman	1966
March 15	Speed Racer (Japan)	1967
March 25	The Monkees	1966
March 25	Armchair Theatre (UK)	1956
March 25	The Bell Telephone Hour	1959
March 25	The Fulton Sheen Program	1961
March 25	The Stairlit Starways	1961
March 27	Run for Your Life	1965
April 1	The Andy Griffith Show	1960
April 15	I Spy	1965
September 8	Ultra Seven (Japan)	1967
Unknown	The Mavis Bramston Show (Australia)	1964
Unknown	The Gumby Show	1957
Unknown	The Road Runner Show (returned in 1971)	1966

== Births ==
Date	Name	Notability
January 2	Cuba Gooding Jr.	American actor
January 5	Carrie Ann Inaba	American dancer and actress (In Living Color, Dancing with the Stars)
January 6	John Singleton	American director (died 2019)
January 12	Farrah Forke	American actress (Wings, Lois and Clark: The New Adventures of Superman) (died 2022)
January 14	LL Cool J	American actor and rapper (In the House, NCIS: Los Angeles)
January 16	David Chokachi	American actor (Baywatch, Beyond the Break)
January 19	Matt Hill	Canadian voice actor (Ed on Ed, Edd n Eddy)
January 21	Charlotte Ross	American actress (Days of Our Lives, NYPD Blue)
January 22	Brian Jones	American host
February 1	Pauly Shore	American actor and comedian
February 3	Vlade Divac	NBA basketball player
February 8	Gary Coleman	American actor (Diff'rent Strokes) (died 2010)
February 12	Josh Brolin	American actor (The Young Riders) and son of James Brolin
February 12	Chynna Phillips	American actress
February 13	Kelly Hu	American actress (Phineas and Ferb)
February 14	Phill Lewis	American actor (The Suite Life of Zack & Cody)
February 18	Molly Ringwald	American actress (The Facts of Life, The Secret Life of the American Teenager)
February 22	Jeri Ryan	American actress (Star Trek: Voyager, Boston Public, Body of Proof)
February 24	Andy Berman	American actor (Invader Zim)
February 26	Ed Quinn	American actor
February 29	Frank Woodley	Australian comedian
February 29	Wendi Peters	English actress
February 29	Dana Schweiger	Model
February 29	Naoko Iijima	Actress
February 29	Suanne Braun	Actress
March 1	Kat Cressida	American voice actress (Dexter's Laboratory, Archer)
March 2	Daniel Craig	Actor
March 4	Patsy Kensit	Actress
March 6	Moira Kelly	American actress (One Tree Hill)
March 20	Liza Snyder	American actress (Yes, Dear, Man with a Plan)
March 27	Ben Koldyke	American actor
March 29	Lucy Lawless	Australian actress (Xena: Warrior Princess)
April 8	Patricia Arquette	American actress (Medium)
April 10	Orlando Jones	American comedian and actor (Mad TV)
April 12	Tracy Vilar	American actress (The Steve Harvey Show)
April 14	Anthony Michael Hall	American actor (Saturday Night Live, The Dead Zone, Psych)
April 19	Ashley Judd	Actress
April 20	Jo Vannicola	Actor
April 24	Stacy Haiduk	American actress (The Young and the Restless)
April 24	Aidan Gillen	American actor
April 26	Angela Santomero	American television executive producer
April 29	Steve Holland	American writer
May 7	Traci Lords	American actress
May 10	Erik Palladino	American actor (ER)
May 11	Jeffrey Donovan	American actor (Burn Notice)
May 12	Catherine Tate	English actress (The Office)
May 14	Johnny A. Sanchez	American comedian and actor (Mad TV)
May 16	Ralph Tresvant	Singer
May 16	David Hollander	Writer
May 16	Stephen Mangan	Actor
May 20	Timothy Olyphant	Actor
May 27	Spencer Kayden	Actress
May 31	Damian Kindler	Writer
June 4	Scott Wolf	American actor (Party of Five, Everwood)
June 7	Mike Barker	American producer
June 11	Jacqueline Mazarella	American actress (Everybody Hates Chris)
June 14	Yasmine Bleeth	American actress (Baywatch)
June 14	Regan Burns	Actor
June 18	Gina Fattore	American producer
June 20	Robert Rodriguez	American filmmaker
June 26	Travis Fine	American actor (The Young Riders)
June 26	Shannon Sharpe	American sports analyst
June 28	Adam Woodyatt	English actor (EastEnders)
June 28	Chayanne	Actor
June 29	Brian d'Arcy James	Actor
July 5	Jillian Armenante	American actress (Judging Amy)
July 5	Tom McCarthy	American sportscaster
July 6	John Dickerson	American journalist (Face the Nation)
July 7	Amy Carlson	American actress (Another World, Third Watch, Blue Bloods)
July 7	Jorja Fox	American actress (ER, CSI: Crime Scene Investigation)
July 8	Michael Weatherly	American actor (Dark Angel, NCIS)
July 11	Conrad Vernon	American actor
July 15	Eddie Griffin	American comedian and actor (Malcolm & Eddie)
July 17	Beth Littleford	Actress
July 17	Bitty Schram	American actress (Monk)
July 18	Grant Bowler	Australian-New Zealand actor (Blue Heelers, Outrageous Fortune, Defiance)
July 18	Alex Désert	American actor (Becker)
July 18	Andre Royo	American actor (The Wire)
July 19	Jim Norton	American comedian and actor (Lucky Louie)
July 20	Melanie Watson Bernhardt	American actress (Diff'rent Strokes)
July 22	Llŷr Ifans	Actor
July 23	Beth Ehlers	American actress (Guiding Light)
July 23	Gary Payton	NBA basketball player
July 23	Stephanie Seymour	Actress
July 24	Kristin Chenoweth	American actress and singer
July 24	Laura Leighton	American actress (Melrose Place, Pretty Little Liars)
July 26	Cress Williams	American Actor (Black Lightning)
July 26	Olivia Williams	Actress
July 27	Julian McMahon	Australian actor (Profiler, Nip/Tuck) (died 2025)
July 27	Jorge Salinas	Actor
July 27	Cliff Curtis	Actor
July 30	Terry Crews	American actor and NFL football player (Everybody Hates Chris, Are We There Yet?, Brooklyn Nine-Nine)
August 2	Melanie Hutsell	American comic actress (Saturday Night Live)
August 2	Alice Evans	American actress
August 4	Daniel Dae Kim	Korean-American actor (Lost, Hawaii Five-0)
August 4	Lee Mack	Actor
August 9	Gillian Anderson	American-British actress (The X-Files)
August 9	Eric Bana	Actor
August 9	McG	American director
August 11	Anna Gunn	American actress (Breaking Bad)
August 11	Sophie Okonedo	English actress
August 14	Ben Bass	American-Canadian actor (Forever Knight, Rookie Blue)
August 14	Adrian Lester	Actor
August 14	Catherine Bell	British-born Iranian-American actress (JAG, Army Wives)
August 15	Debra Messing	American actress (Will & Grace)
August 16	Karine Le Marchand	French television host
August 17	Orlagh Cassidy	American actress (Guiding Light, Another World)
August 25	Rachael Ray	American author, chef and television host
August 30	Michelle Franzen	New York-based midday anchor
September 2	Cynthia Watros	American actress (Guiding Light, The Drew Carey Show, Lost)
September 4	John DiMaggio	American voice actor (Futurama, Samurai Jack, Kim Possible, Teen Titans, American Dragon: Jake Long, Chowder, Kick Buttowski: Suburban Daredevil, Adventure Time, Gravity Falls, Sanjay and Craig, The Loud House)
September 9	Jocelyn Seagrave	American actress (Guiding Light)
September 12	Ramón Franco	American actor (Tour of Duty)
September 12	Paul F. Tompkins	American actor
September 20	Philippa Forrester	British television presenter
September 20	Van Jones	American political commentator (CNN)
September 21	Ricki Lake	American actress, talk show host
September 25	Will Smith	American actor and rapper (The Fresh Prince of Bel-Air)
September 26	Jim Caviezel	American actor (The Passion of the Christ, Person of Interest)
September 28	Naomi Watts	British actress
October 4	Jennifer Gatti	American actress (Guiding Light, The Young and the Restless)
October 5	Danny Cannon	British film and television producer
October 8	Emily Procter	American actress (The West Wing, CSI: Miami)
October 11	Jane Krakowski	American actress (Ally McBeal, 30 Rock)
October 12	Hugh Jackman	Australian actor
October 12	Adam Rich	American actor (Eight is Enough) (died 2023)
October 13	Tisha Campbell	American actress and singer (Martin, My Wife and Kids)
October 15	Vanessa Marcil	American actress (General Hospital, Beverly Hills, 90210, Las Vegas)
October 20	Sunny Hostin	American journalist and TV host
October 27	Cristina Perez	American judge
October 28	Chris Broussard	American sports analyst
November 2	Samantha Ferris	Canadian actress (The 4400)
November 5	Matt Kunitz	American television executive producer
November 6	Kelly Rutherford	American actress (Generations, Melrose Place, Gossip Girl)
November 7	Tracy Smith	American journalist
November 10	Tracy Morgan	American actor and comedian (Saturday Night Live, Scare Tactics, 30 Rock)
November 10	Tom Papa	American actor and comedian
November 14	Steve Callaghan	American voice actor
November 14	Roland Martin	American journalist
November 18	Owen Wilson	American actor
November 22	Khalil Kain	American actor (Girlfriends)
November 25	Jill Hennessy	Canadian actress (Law & Order, Crossing Jordan)
November 27	Michael Vartan	French-American actor (Alias, Hawthorne)
December 2	Lucy Liu	American actress (Ally McBeal, Elementary, Maya & Miguel, Kung Fu Panda: Legends of Awesomeness)
December 3	Brendan Fraser	American actor
December 3	Montell Jordan	American singer
December 8	Joy Reid	American political commentator (MSNBC)
December 9	Kurt Angle	American wrestler
December 14	Noelle Beck	American actress (Loving)
December 15	Garrett Wang	American actor (Star Trek: Voyager)
December 17	Greg Kelly	American conservative television anchor
December 18	Rachel Griffiths	Australian actress (Six Feet Under, Brothers & Sisters)
December 21	Khrystyne Haje	American actress (Head of the Class)
December 22	Lauralee Bell	American soap opera actress (The Young and the Restless)
December 26	Bill Lawrence	American producer

== Deaths ==
Date	Name	Age	Notability
May 9	Marion Lorne	84	Actress (Aunt Clara on Bewitched)
June 7	Dan Duryea	61	Actor (Peyton Place)
September 19	Red Foley	58	Singer (Ozark Jubilee)
October 13	Bea Benaderet	62	Actress (Kate on Petticoat Junction; original voice of Betty Rubble on The Flintstones)

== Television debuts ==
- Linda Blair – Hidden Faces
- Bud Cort – The Doctors
- Blythe Danner – N.Y.P.D.
- Jodie Foster – Mayberry R.F.D.
- Howard Hesseman – The Andy Griffith Show
- Margot Kidder – Wojeck
- Al Pacino – N.Y.P.D.
- Austin Pendleton – One Life to Live
- Joffre Soares – Beto Rockfeller
- M. Emmet Walsh – The Doctors

== See also ==
- 1968–69 United States network television schedule
