= Episode 11,000 =

- The Young and the Restless episode
- Episode no.: Episode 11000
- Directed by: Sally McDonald
- Original air date: September 1, 2016
- Running time: 60 minutes (including advertisements)

Guest appearances
- Michael Graziadei as Daniel Romalotti; Nichelle Nichols as Lucinda Winters; Tristan Rogers as Colin Atkinson; Lee Phillip Bell

Episode chronology
← Previous; Episode 10,999	Next → Episode 11,001

Episode 11,000 of the American television soap opera The Young and the Restless aired on September 1, 2016, on CBS. This special episode was heavily promoted and teased in order to celebrate the soap opera's milestone. The episode featured the return of Tristan Rogers and Michael Graziadei as Colin Atkinson and Daniel Romalotti, respectively, and marked the beginning of Nichelle Nichols's guest stint as Lucinda Winters, the estranged mother of Neil Winters (Kristoff St. John). The episode also featured a cameo from the soap's co-creator, Lee Phillip Bell. The plot revolved around Neil and Lucinda's reunion, the exposure of Phyllis Summers (Gina Tognoni) and Billy Abbott's (Jason Thompson) affair and Chloe Mitchell's (Elizabeth Hendrickson) plan to kill Adam Newman (Justin Hartley), among other stories. The episode also marked the last appearance of Hartley as Adam, whose departure had not been confirmed beforehand. Michael Fairman from On-Air On-Soaps praised the episode and called it the best episode of the year in American soap operas.

== Premise ==
Chloe Mitchell (Elizabeth Hendrickson), wanting revenge for the death of her daughter, Delia Abbott (Sophie Pollono) in a hit and run, tries to kill Adam Newman (Justin Hartley). Adam's wife, Chelsea Lawson (Melissa Claire Egan), and his half-brother, Nicholas Newman (Joshua Morrow), try to get him out but fail to and the house that he is an explodes, presumably killing Adam. Neil Winters (Kristoff St. John) reunites with his estranged mother, Lucinda Winters (Nichelle Nichols), and learns why she disappeared years ago. Meanwhile, Phyllis Summers (Gina Tognoni)'s affair with her brother-in-law, Billy Abbott (Jason Thompson), is exposed, and Summer Newman's (Hunter King) family try their hardest to get Luca Santori (Miles Gaston Villanueva) out of her life.

== Production ==
On July 19, 2016, it was announced that The Young and the Restless would be airing its 10,000th episode on September 1 of that year. It was also announced that Michael Graziadei and Tristan Rogers would be returning to the soap as Daniel Romalotti and Colin Atkinson, respectively, for the episode. It was teased that the soap's storylines would "heat up", with spoilers revealing that the affair of Phyllis Summers (Gina Tognoni) and Billy Abbott (Jason Thompson) would be exposed, and that Summer Newman's (Hunter King) would be doing "whatever is necessary" to get Luca Santori (Miles Gaston Villanueva) out of her life. CBS News teased that "the drama continues as relationships are tested, scores are settled, and lives are changed forever".

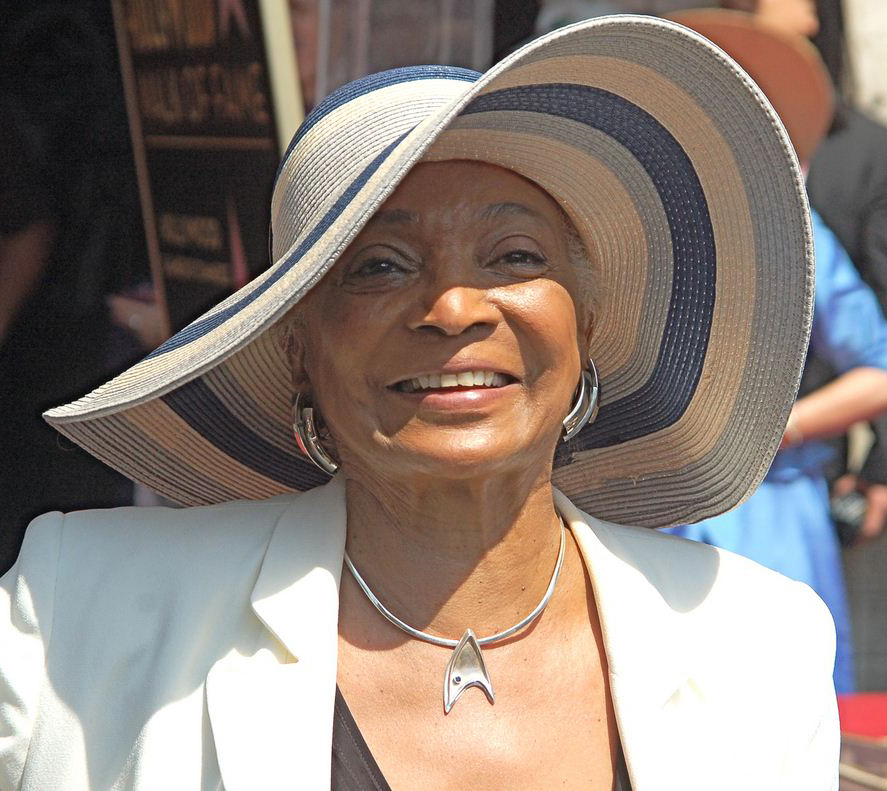
Nichelle Nichols debuted in this episode

It was also reported Lee Phillip Bell – who had created The Young and the Restless with her husband, William J. Bell – would appear in the episode. It was reported that she would appear in a scene with her daughter, Lauralee Bell (who portrays Christine Blair) and Doug Davidson (who portrays Christine's husband, Paul Williams), at the Genoa City Athletic Club. Michael Logan from TV Insider called the "beloved television pioneer" co-creator's appearance "the Mother of All Cameos" and teased that her scenes with the characters would be "super charming". Logan also congratulated the creator and team at CBS and The Young and the Restless for reaching its "awesome landmark".

Additionally, it was announced that Star Trek star Nichelle Nichols had joined the soap for a two-episode stint beginning with the 11,000th episode. Speaking of joining the soap, Nichols told Mashable, "I'm thrilled and honored to be a member of the cast of this historic moment in daytime television. I've been a huge fan of 'The Young and the Restless' for decades. I'm equally honored to be from Chicago like the Bell Family who created this incredible TV show." The Young and the Restless executive producer and head writer Charles Pratt Jr. was excited for Nichols to join the soap opera and praised her performance, explaining, "I cannot even describe my utter joy and excitement to get the chance to write for and work with the talented Nichelle. She slipped into her role with sublime grace and ease, and just that brushstroke of elegance we needed. What fun, and what a thrill, for all of us at Y&R."

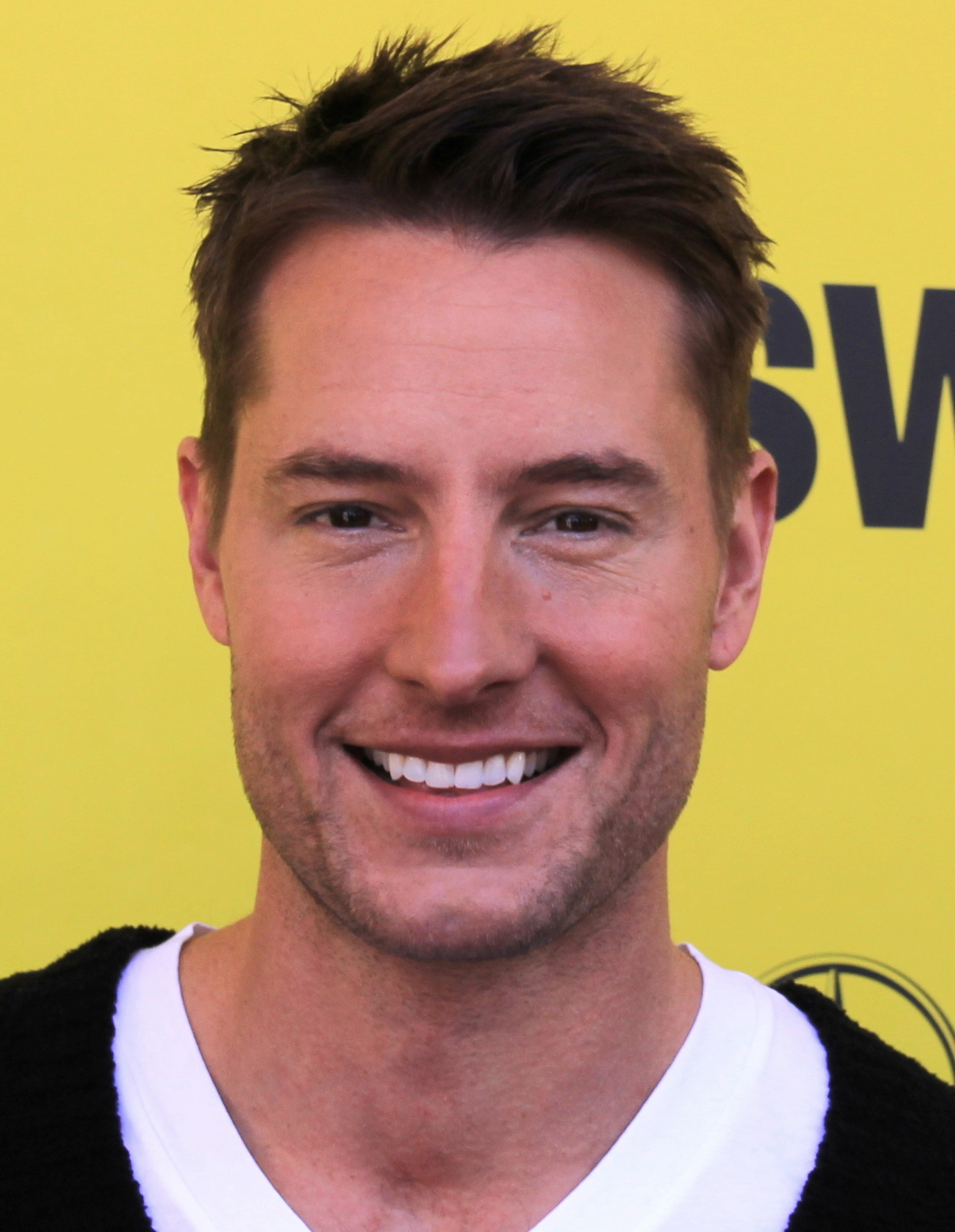
The episode marked the last appearance of Justin Hartley as Adam Newman.

Nicholas was later revealed to be playing Lucinda Winters, the estranged biological mother of Neil Winters (Kristoff St. John), with the episode explaining why Lucinda had disappeared from Neil's life years prior. Speaking about working Nichols, St. John revealed, "I've met Nichelle two times before and I was absolutely enthralled that I was meeting [Nichols' Star Trek character] Lt. Uhura. This time, when we met, I was thrilled to be working with such an iconic actress, just by default of being part of the '60s era, when there were very few African American leads, male and female, on television. I felt very honored to share these scenes with Nichelle, knowing her body of work".

To promote the episode and celebrate the milestone, Soap Opera Digest included vintage photos of the soap opera's early years in their new issue of the magazine. They also included a feature of the cast's memories of their first day on set, and another feature to "salute" Doug Davidson, the soap's longest-running cast member, by having the cast "rave about what makes this guy so special". An updated cast photo was also released to promote the episode. To further celebrate and promote the milestone, cast member Christian LeBlanc, who portrays Michael Baldwin, interviewed other cast members about the soap opera. Additionally, BravoTV.com reported how Eileen Davidson, who portrays Ashley Abbott, was excited to be part of the episode.

The episode aired at 12:30pm ET on CBS. The episode also featured the "grand exit" of Justin Hartley as Adam Newman, which was not announced prior. Fans had been speculating over what would happen to Adam's character due to Hartley's series, This Is Us, being greenlit by NBC, though some fans had hoped that Hartley would be on both shows and not leave The Young and the Restless. The episode featured a "vengeful" Chloe Mitchell (Elizabeth Hendrickson) put her plan in motion to kill Adam, which results in his being presumed dead in an explosion. Following the episode airing, Hartley confirmed that he had left the soap opera and thanked his fans for their support.

== Reception ==
Prior to the airing of the episode, a writer from CBS News wrote that fans would be "treated" to Bill and Nichols' special appearances. A writer from KFVS-TV called the reaching of 11,000 episodes a "remarkable milestone". Chris Eades from Soaps In Depth teased, "do not miss today's special 11,000th episode!"

Michael Fairman from On-Air On-Soaps believed that Episode 11,000 was the best episode of 2016 in American soap operas, calling it "highly-anticipated, and highly promoted Y&R11K" that "delivered and lived up to the hype." He attributed "Chloe's return with a dart gun to paralyze and finish off Adam once and for all", the final scene where "Adam is blown to smithereens as Nick and Chelsea go back to get him", Neil reuniting with his alcoholic dying mother after years apart and Bell's appearance on the episode as some of his highlights from the episode. Fairman added, "it was an emotional, and shocking rollercoaster ride for viewers, and you could not ask for more than that."
