= Lady Magdalene's =

- Directed by: J. Neil Schulman
- Written by: J. Neil Schulman
- Produced by: J. Neil Schulman
- Starring: Nichelle Nichols
- Cinematography: Scott MacDonald
- Edited by: J. Kent Hastings
- Music by: Daniel May
- Distributed by: Amazon Prime
- Release date: February 2, 2008 (San Diego Black Film Festival)
- Running time: 116 minutes
- Country: United States
- Language: English
- Budget: $500,000

Lady Magdalene's is a film directed, written and produced by J. Neil Schulman and starring Nichelle Nichols (who also received an executive producer credit). The movie was J. Neil Schulman's debut as a director, and Nichelle Nichols' debut as a producer.

== Plot ==
Jack Goldwater, an IRS agent on loan to the Federal Air Marshal Service, is relieved of field duty after insulting a powerful U.S. senator, and finds himself exiled to a humiliating desk job in Nevada as the federal receiver managing a legal brothel in tax default, where—with the help of the brothel Madam, Lady Magdalene—he uncovers an Al Qaeda plot to unload a nuclear-bomb-sized crate at Hoover Dam.

== Cast (opening titles) ==
- Nichelle Nichols as Lady Magdalene
- Ethan Keogh as Jack Goldwater
- Susan Smythe as Angel
- Claudia Lynx as Scheherazade
- Alexander Wraith as Yassin Salem
- Mark Gilvary as The Director & FBI SAC Broderick
- J. Neil Schulman as Ali the American
- Said Faraj as Gamal Hosny
- Mara Marini as Nurse Gretchen
- Vince Martorano as IRS Agent Lewis Heinlein
- Hope McBane as Sinead
- Michele Redmond as Eden
- Keyaria Rodriguez as Pixie

== Release ==
The movie was produced by Schulman's own film company Jesulu Productions. After film-festival play the full movie was released on YouTube.

== Awards ==
The film won three film-festival awards: "Best Cutting Edge Film" at the 2008 San Diego Film Festival, "Audience Choice – Feature-Length Narrative Film" at the 2008 Cinema City International Film Festival held at Universal CityWalk Hollywood, and "Special Jury Prize for Libertarian Ideals" at the 2011 Anthem Film Festival/FreedomFest held at Bally's Las Vegas.
