= Lee Erwin (writer) =

American television writer

- Born: September 12, 1906; Ada, Oklahoma, U.S.
- Died: June 4, 1972 (aged 65); Los Angeles, California, U.S.
- Occupation: Television screenwriter
- Years active: 1953-1971

Lee Erwin (September 12, 1906, in Ada, Oklahoma – June 4, 1972 in Los Angeles, California) was a television writer from the 1950s to the 1970s.

Erwin wrote for Mr. & Mrs. North, The Millionaire, Have Gun, Will Travel, The New Adventures of Charlie Chan and many other 1950s and 1960s TV shows. He is probably best known for his Star Trek episode "Whom Gods Destroy", and his two-part Tarzan episode "The Deadly Silence". His episode of The Lieutenant, "To Set It Right", was controversial behind the scenes because the subject matter, racial prejudice, was taboo for entertainment television at the time. Despite claims that it never aired, Gene Roddenberry said it did, and the segment was reviewed by Daily Variety. The episode was included in the 2012 DVD set The Lieutenant: The Complete Series, Part 2, from Warner Media, and a copy exists at The Paley Center for Media. Erwin's last work for television was the script for the All in the Family episode "Writing the President" (1971).

Erwin died in Los Angeles in 1972 at age 57.

== Filmography ==
=== Films ===
Year	Film	Credit	Notes
1959	The Flying Fontaines	Written By	
1970	Tarzan's Deadly Silence	Written By	Co-Wrote screenplay with "John Considine", "Tim Considine", and "Jack H. Robinson"

=== Television ===
Year	TV Series	Credit	Notes
1954	Mr. and Mrs. North	Writer	10 Episodes
1954	Captain Midnight	Writer	
1955	Tales of the Texas Rangers	Writer	
1955	Sheena, Queen of the Jungle	Writer	1 Episode
1955–56	Jungle Jim	Writer	3 Episodes
1956	The Millionaire	Writer	3 Episodes
1956	Crossroads	Writer	1 Episode
1956	The Adventures of Wild Bill Hickok	Writer	1 Episode
1956	Tales of the 77th Bengal Lancers	Writer	1 Episode
1956	The Adventures of Rin Tin Tin	Writer	3 Episodes
1956–57	Circus Boy	Writer	12 Episodes
1957	Have Gun – Will Travel	Writer	1 Episode
1957-58	Casey Jones	Writer	2 Episodes
1957-58	White Hunter	Writer	5 Episodes
1957-58	The New Adventures of Charlie Chan	Writer	5 Episodes
1958-59	Sea Hunt	Writer	10 Episodes
1958-59	Whirlybirds	Writer	2 Episodes
1959	Richard Diamond, Private Detective	Writer	2 Episodes
1959	The Man and The Challenge	Writer	1 Episode
1959–62	Laramine	Writer	12 Episodes
1960	M Squad	Writer	1 Episode
1961	The New Bob Cummings Show	Writer	1 Episode
1962	Frontier Circus	Writer	1 Episode
1962	The Dick Van Dyke Show	Writer	1 Episode
1962–63	Ripcord	Writer	6 Episodes
1963	The Alfred Hitchcock Hour	Writer	1 Episode
1963–64	The Lieutenant	Writer	3 Episodes
1964–65	Flipper	Writer	5 Episodes
1965	Please Don’t Eat The Daisies	Writer	2 Episodes
1965	Peyton Place	Writer	7 Episodes
1965	The F.B.I.	Writer	1 Episode
1966	Bewitched	Writer	3 Episodes
1966–68	Tarzan	Writer	2 Episodes
1967	Felony Squad	Writer	1 Episode
1968	The Big Valley	Writer	2 Episodes
1968	Maya	Writer	1 Episode
1968–69	The Flying Nun	Writer	3 Episodes
1969	Star Trek	Writer	1 Episode
1971	All in the Family	Writer	1 Episode
1971	Make Room for Granddaddy	Writer	1 Episode
1971	Monty Nash	Writer	1 Episode
1973	Love, American Style	Writer	1 Episode, Segment: "Love and the Playwright"
1988	Alfred Hitchcock Presents	Writer	1 Episode
