= List of The Young and the Restless characters introduced in 2016 =

The Young and the Restless is an American television soap opera. It was first broadcast on March 26, 1973, and airs on CBS. The following is a list of characters that first appeared on the soap opera in 2016, by order of first appearance. In the first half of the year, characters were introduced by executive producer Jill Farren Phelps until her replacement in the summer of 2016 by supervising producer Mal Young Young was first credited as executive producer on July 13, 2016. Co-executive producer and head writer Charles Pratt Jr. oversaw the creation and introduction of the characters until his replacement by Sally Sussman Morina. Sussman's tenure as head writer began taping on October 20, 2016, and aired on December 7, 2016.

== Max Rayburn ==
Max Rayburn
- The Young and the Restless character
- Portrayed by: Jared Breeze
- Duration: 2016
- First appearance: January 6, 2016
- Last appearance: May 17, 2016
- Created by: Charles Pratt Jr. (Note: The character's introduction as Stitch's child was shown in 2014, under head writers Shelly Altman and Jean Passanante. The character was later developed and introduced under Phelps and head writer, Charles Pratt Jr.)
- Introduced by: Jill Farren Phelps
In-universe information
- Father: Stitch Rayburn
- Mother: Jenna Kieran
- Stepmother: Abby Newman
- Grandparents: Richard Russell; Maureen Russell
- Aunts: Kelly Andrews
- First cousins: Sam Andrews

Max Rayburn, portrayed by Jared Breeze, is introduced on January 6. Max is the young son of Stitch Rayburn (Sean Carrigan). Stitch and his new wife Abby Newman (Melissa Ordway) are called to the police station where the find Max. It is revealed that Max and his mom, Jenna Kieran (Stephanie Lemelin) were involved in a car accident that results in Jenna's death on New Year's Eve. Max blames Abby for the accident as it occurs when Abby and Jenna were on the phone. While he resents Abby, Max takes a liking to her mother, Ashley Abbott (Eileen Davidson) and Simon Neville (Michael E. Knight). Max does not approve when Abby and Stitch announce that they are pregnant and he fantasizes about pushing Abby down the stairs. However, Max pretends to be happy and encourages his father to throw a surprise baby shower. Max uses fishing wire to make Abby fall down the stairs and she ends up in the hospital, much to his delight. When Max tries to get rid of the evidence, and he is confronted by Lily (Christel Khalil) and Cane Ashby (Daniel Goddard) and they question him about Abby's fall. The surveillance footage makes it appear to be an accident. Abby suffers a miscarriage and Max gives her a card that says "Forget Me Not" which makes her very uncomfortable.

== Natalie Soderberg ==
Natalie Soderberg
- The Young and the Restless character
- Portrayed by: Mara McCaffray
- Duration: 2016
- First appearance: January 15, 2016
- Last appearance: November 2, 2016
- Created by: Charles Pratt Jr.
- Introduced by: Jill Farren Phelps
In-universe information
- Occupation: Hacker

Natalie Soderberg, played by Mara McCaffray, introduced on January 16, is a computer hacker Kevin Fisher meets in Switzerland.

== Shawn Taylor ==
Shawn Taylor, portrayed by Devon Martinez, is a pregnant woman looking to give up her baby for adoption. Martinez is the daughter of daytime legend, A Martinez. Martinez made her debut on March 1.

== Meredith Gates ==
Meredith Gates, portrayed by Alicia Coppola, is introduced as a doctor attending to Victor Newman (Eric Braeden) who is in prison on April 13.

== Travis Crawford ==
Travis Crawford
- The Young and the Restless character
- Portrayed by: Michael Roark
- Duration: 2016
- First appearance: April 29, 2016
- Last appearance: December 6, 2016
- Created by: Charles Pratt Jr.
- Introduced by: Jill Farren Phelps
In-universe information
- Occupation: Bartender; Bar owner; Commodities Trader

Travis Crawford, portrayed by Michael Roark, is introduced on April 29 as the owner of Hank's Dive Bar which is frequented by Victoria Newman (Amelia Heinle). Roark vacated the role on December 6.

== Bethany Bryant ==
Bethany Bryant
- The Young and the Restless character
- Portrayed by: Chrishell Stause
- Duration: 2016
- First appearance: May 25, 2016
- Last appearance: August 17, 2016
- Created by: Charles Pratt Jr.
- Introduced by: Jill Farren Phelps
In-universe information
- Occupation: Waitress

Bethany Bryant, portrayed by Chrishell Stause, was introduced May 25 as a waitress at Billy Abbott's (Jason Thompson) restaurant. Stause was best known to daytime fans as Amanda Dillon on All My Children and Jordan Ridgeway on Days of Our Lives. At the time, Stause was also engaged to Justin Hartley who played Adam Newman. Stause last appeared on August 17. Bethany has a huge crush on Billy and finds him drinking at a local bar, but he doesn't remember her name and they sleep together. Billy's mother Jill Abbott (Jess Walton) finds them in the afterglow and chastises her son leading to Billy rejecting Bethany. When Billy gets into a motorcycle accident, his sister-in-law Phyllis Summers (Gina Tognoni) bribes Bethany into claiming she was with him. Realizing Phyllis is the reason Billy rejected her, Bethany agrees to pose as Billy's girlfriend to meet his brother Jack (Peter Bergman). Bethany taunts Phyllis and warns Billy that Jack will become suspicious if he isn't more convincing. Phyllis changes her mind and offers Bethany to leave town. When the truth comes out, Bethany offers to date Billy to help him get over Phyllis and he agrees though he is still in love with Phyllis. Bethany later receives more money and suspects Billy, Jill or Phyllis of trying to pay her off only to discover it is Victor Newman (Eric Braeden).

== Lucinda Winters ==
Lucinda Winters
- The Young and the Restless character
- Portrayed by: Nichelle Nichols
- First appearance: September 1, 2016
- Last appearance: September 5, 2016
- Created by: Charles Pratt Jr.
- Introduced by: Mal Young
In-universe information
- Family: Winters
- Spouse: Ellis Winters
- Children: Neil Winters
- Grandchildren: Lily Winters (legal); Devon Hamilton (adoptive); Moses Winters
- Other relatives: Charlie Ashby; Mattie Ashby

Lucinda Winters, played by Nichelle Nichols, is the estranged mother of Neil Winters (Kristoff St. John). Nichols first appeared on September 1.

== Ravi Shapur ==
Ravi Shapur
- The Young and the Restless character
- Portrayed by: Abhi Sinha
- Duration: 2016–18
- First appearance: December 12, 2016
- Last appearance: May 14, 2018
- Created by: Sally Sussman
- Introduced by: Mal Young
In-universe information
- Occupation: Computer Engineer
- Aunts and uncles: Nikhil

Ravi Shapur, portrayed by Abhi Sinha, is a computer engineer hired by Jabot Cosmetics. Abhi made his debut on December 12, on a recurring basis. On News Years eve 2016, Ravi kisses Ashley Abbott, as he has formed feelings for her. Ashley initially disregards Ravi, however she later shows interest in him. In August 2017, Ashley and Ravi have sex, however they both decide to remain close friends, nothing more. In April 2018, Ravi helps Kyle Abbott decode a video file burnt by Ashley, revealing that Jack is not John's son. Since then he has faded out, and last appeared in May 2018.
