= Don Penny =

American television actor and comedian (1933–2024)

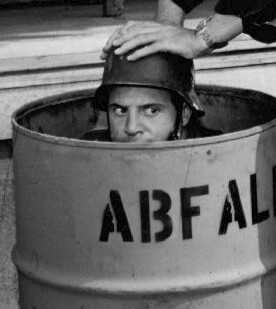
- Penny in 12 O'Clock High, 1965
- Born: Donald Penny Schneider; April 6, 1933; Brooklyn, New York, U.S.
- Died: May 6, 2024 (aged 91); Palmetto, Florida, U.S.
- Occupation(s): Television actor, comedian
- Years active: 1962–1975

Donald Penny Schneider (April 6, 1933 – May 6, 2024) was an American television actor and comedian.

== Life and career ==
Donald Penny Schneider was born in Brooklyn, New York, on April 6, 1933, the son of Max and Rose Schneider.

Penny is known for playing the role of Lieutenant Stanley Harris in the American television series The Lieutenant, and Pharmacist Mate Charles Tyler in The Wackiest Ship in the Army. He also worked for 38th president of the United States, Gerald Ford, as a speech writer.

On May 6, 2024, Penny died in Palmetto, Florida, at the age of 91.

== Filmography ==
=== Film ===
Year	Title	Role	Notes
1967	Three's a Crowd	Harvey	TV movie
1975	Pick-Up	Politician	

=== Television ===
Year	Title	Role	Notes
1962	The Brighter Day	Toby Ballard	unknown episodes
1962	Hennesey	Lt. Bob Alexander/Lt. Bob Anderson	2 episodes
1962	The Danny Thomas Show	Cousin Don	1 episode
1963–1964	The Lieutenant	Lieutenant Stanley Harris	14 episodes
1964	CBS Workshop		1 episode
1964	The Bing Crosby Show	Harold	1 episode
1965–1966	The Wackiest Ship in the Army	Pharmacist Mate Charles Tyler	17 episodes
1965	12 O'Clock High	Captain Butcher/Lieutenant Regis	3 episodes
1966	Please Don't Eat the Daisies	Sam	1 episode
1966	The Monkees	Honeywell	1 episode
1967	Bewitched	Barney	1 episode
1967–1968	That Girl	Seymour Schwimmer	2 episodes
1967	Occasional Wife	Teddy	1 episode
1968	Insight	Al	1 episode
