= Kirk and Uhura's kiss =

Scene of a television episode

William Shatner as James T. Kirk and Nichelle Nichols as Lt. Uhura in the November 22, 1968 Star Trek episode, "Plato's Stepchildren."

In the episode of Star Trek: The Original Series titled "Plato's Stepchildren", season 3 episode 10, first broadcast November 22, 1968, Uhura (played by Black American actress Nichelle Nichols) and Captain Kirk (played by white actor William Shatner) kiss. The episode is often cited—incorrectly—as the first interracial kiss on television. It was, however, the first instance in which a kiss between a black person and a white person on a regular U.S. television show was scripted, as an earlier kiss on Movin' with Nancy was unscripted. The episode aired one year after the U.S. Supreme Court struck down nationwide laws prohibiting interracial marriage.

== Historical context ==
Identifying the first interracial kiss on television is a subject of debate. Historians noted that interracial kisses between blacks and whites were depicted on British television during live plays as early as 1959, and on subsequent soap operas like Emergency Ward 10. In the United States, the Cuban Desi Arnaz and white Lucille Ball kissed frequently on I Love Lucy, in the 1950s. Despite Arnaz and Ball being frequently described as an "interracial couple", "Hispanic" is not by some definitions a straightforward racial category, (Note: The United States Census Bureau uses the ethnonyms "Hispanic or Latino" to refer to a person of Cuban, Mexican, Puerto Rican, South or Central American, or other Spanish culture or origin regardless of race; the Census Bureau states, "People who identify their origin as Hispanic, Latino, or Spanish may be any race.") and Arnaz was a white man of Cuban ancestry. In 1958, a decade prior to "Plato's Stepchildren", Shatner himself shared an interracial kiss with France Nuyen, a person of Asian ancestry, during a scene in the Broadway production of The World of Suzie Wong, which was shown in an episode of The Ed Sullivan Show. Other shows such as Adventures in Paradise and I Spy featured kisses between white male actors and Asian actresses. Sammy Davis Jr. kissed Nancy Sinatra on the cheek on a December 1967 episode of her televised special Movin' with Nancy.

On Star Trek, in the season one episode "What Are Little Girls Made Of?", first broadcast in October 1966, there is a friendly kiss between Uhura, played by Nichols and Christine Chapel, played by Majel Barrett. In the February 16, 1967 episode "Space Seed", Mexican actor Ricardo Montalban, playing the genetically engineered supercriminal Khan Noonien Singh, kisses Madlyn Rhue. In the season two episode "Mirror, Mirror", first broadcast on October 6, 1967, Kirk and Lieutenant Marlena Moreau, played by BarBara Luna, an actress of Filipino-European ancestry, kiss on the lips. Meanwhile, Mirror-Sulu, played by Japanese-American actor George Takei, kisses Uhura's neck.

According to Syracuse University Professor of television and popular culture Robert Thompson, irrespective of which interracial kiss was the first, Thompson observed, the one in "Plato's Stepchildren" “seems to be the one that is considered a milestone.”

"Plato's Stepchildren" first aired November 22, 1968, one year after Loving v. Virginia, in which the U.S. Supreme Court declared unconstitutional nationwide laws prohibiting interracial marriage between Blacks and whites, between whites and Native Americans, Filipinos, Asians and, in some states, "all non-whites". That year, only 3 percent of newlyweds were interracial couples. In contrast, in 2015, 17 percent of newlyweds were interracial couples, according to a Pew Research Center analysis of U.S. Census Bureau data.

== Production ==
In "Plato's Stepchildren", which was broadcast in 1968, the kiss is involuntarily forced by psychokinesis. Shatner recalls in Star Trek Memories that NBC insisted their lips never touch, using the technique of turning their heads away from the camera to conceal this. In an April 2024 interview with Bill Maher, he again said that the network did not want their lips to touch, but they did anyway. Nichols also writes in her 1994 autobiography, Beyond Uhura, that the kiss was real, even during takes in which her head obscures their lips. She also gave this account in multiple recorded interviews.

When NBC executives learned of the kiss, they became concerned it would anger TV stations in the Deep South. Earlier in 1968, NBC had expressed similar concern over a musical sequence in a Petula Clark special in which she touched Harry Belafonte's arm, a moment that has been incorrectly cited as the first physical contact on American television between a man and woman of different races. At one point during negotiations, the idea was brought up of having Spock kiss Uhura instead (as Spock was half Vulcan), but William Shatner insisted that they stick with the original script. NBC finally ordered that two versions of the scene be shot—one in which Kirk and Uhura kissed and one in which they did not.

Worried producers decided to film the kiss between Shatner and Nichols with their lips mostly obscured by the back of Nichols' head. They also intended to film a second take in which it occurs off-screen. However, Nichols stated in her memoir, Beyond Uhura: Star Trek and Other Memories, that she and Shatner deliberately flubbed lines to force the original take to be used. As Nichols recounts:

Knowing that Gene was determined to air the real kiss, Bill shook me and hissed menacingly in his best ham-fisted Kirkian staccato delivery, "I! WON'T! KISS! YOU! I! WON'T! KISS! YOU!"

It was absolutely awful, and we were hysterical and ecstatic. The director was beside himself, and still determined to get the kissless shot. So we did it again, and it seemed to be fine. "Cut! Print! That's a wrap!"

The next day, they screened the dailies, and although I rarely attended them, I couldn't miss this one. Everyone watched as Kirk and Uhura kissed and kissed and kissed. And I'd like to set the record straight: although Kirk and Uhura fought it, they did kiss in every single scene. When the non-kissing scene came on, everyone in the room cracked up. The last shot, which looked okay on the set, actually had Bill wildly crossing his eyes. It was so corny and just plain bad, it was unusable. The only alternative was to cut out the scene altogether, but that was impossible to do without ruining the entire episode. Finally, the guys in charge relented: "To hell with it. Let's go with the kiss." I guess they figured we were going to be cancelled in a few months anyway. And so the kiss stayed.

== Reception ==
While there was much talk among the production staff about the kiss, it did not garner much reaction from the general public nor the television industry, according to Thompson, who stated, "It neither got the backlash one might have expected nor did it open the doors for lots more shows to do this. The shot heard around the world started the American Revolution. The kiss heard around the world eventually did ... but not immediately."

There are no records of any public complaints about the scene. Nichols observed that "Plato's Stepchildren", which first aired on November 22, 1968, "received a huge response. We received one of the largest batches of fan mail ever, all of it very positive, with many addressed to me from girls wondering how it felt to kiss Captain Kirk, and many to him from guys wondering the same thing about me. However, almost no one found the kiss offensive," except from a single mildly negative letter from one white Southerner who wrote: "I am totally opposed to the mixing of the races. However, any time a red-blooded American boy like Captain Kirk gets a beautiful dame in his arms that looks like Uhura, he ain't gonna fight it." Nichols said she found the episode to be the most memorable one from the show's final season.

Nichols said in 2010 the episode's iconic status is due to its profound effect on viewers, commenting, "The first thing people want to talk about is the first interracial kiss and what it did for them. And they thought of the world differently, they thought of people differently." Eric Deggans, national television critic for National Public Radio, said the kiss "suggested that there was a future where these issues were not such a big deal. The characters themselves were not freaking out because a black woman was kissing a white man. ... In this utopian-like future, we solved this issue. We're beyond it. That was a wonderful message to send."

In 2016, TVLine ranked the kiss as one of the top 20 moments of Star Trek. In 2016, Radio Times ranked the kiss as the 25th best moment in all Star Trek, including later spin-off series. The cultural impact of the kiss was noted by National Geographic, in 2016. WhatCulture ranked this the 8th best romantic-sexual moment in Star Trek.

== See also ==
- "Rejoined", a Star Trek: Deep Space Nine episode in which two female Trills kiss
- Golden Boy, Lorna Moon and Sammy Davis Jr. 1964
