= Plato's Stepchildren =

- Star Trek: The Original Series episode
- Episode no.: Season 3 Episode 10
- Directed by: David Alexander
- Written by: Meyer Dolinsky
- Cinematography by: Al Francis
- Production code: 067
- Original air date: November 22, 1968

Guest appearances
- Michael Dunn – Alexander; Barbara Babcock – Philana; Liam Sullivan – Parmen; Ted Scott – Eraclitus; Derek Partridge – Dionyd; William Blackburn – Lt. Hadley

Episode chronology
← Previous "The Tholian Web"	Next → "Wink of an Eye"
- Star Trek: The Original Series season 3

"Plato's Stepchildren" is the tenth episode of the third season of the American science fiction television series Star Trek. Written by Meyer Dolinsky and directed by David Alexander, it was first broadcast on November 22, 1968.

In the episode, the crew of the Enterprise encounter an ageless and sadistic race of humanoids with the power of telekinesis.

The episode is notable for depicting a kiss between a white man (Kirk) and a black woman (Uhura), which was among the earliest instances of this on a US television show.

It was one of several episodes not screened by the BBC because of their "unpleasant" content, including torture and sadism.

== Plot ==
Captain Kirk, along with First Officer Spock and Chief Medical Officer Dr. McCoy, beams down to a planet to investigate a distress call. Once there, they are greeted by a friendly little person named Alexander (Michael Dunn). He leads the landing party to meet the rest of his people, who have adopted classical Greek culture, and named themselves Platonians in honor of the Greek philosopher Plato.

All of the Platonians, except for Alexander, possess telekinetic powers, and the planet's ruling class have become exceedingly arrogant as a result, believing they can do as they please because of their powers. The Platonians explain they "lured" the Enterprise to their planet because their leader, Parmen, requires medical help. After being treated by Dr. McCoy, Parmen demands McCoy remain on the planet to treat other Platonians. When Captain Kirk objects, the Platonians use their powers to punish him.

Alexander tries to tell Kirk and Spock that Parmen wishes to kill them but is afraid.

Parmen repeatedly humiliates Kirk and Spock as Dr. McCoy watches, trying to make him agree to stay on the planet. Later, the Platonians use their powers to force two other Enterprise officers to the planet for their entertainment: Communications Officer Lt. Uhura and Nurse Chapel.

McCoy takes a sample of Alexander's blood and manages to isolate and identify the kironide mineral that provides the inhabitants with their special powers; it is abundant in the natural food and water supply of the planet. McCoy is able to prepare a serum and inject Kirk and Spock with doses to make them have twice the power of Parmen. (He observes that Alexander's lack of pituitary growth hormone makes him unable to metabolize the kironide and gain the telekinetic ability. Alexander declares that he would not want the ability anyway; he would not want to risk becoming like the Platonians.) Alexander asks where Kirk comes from, and if size matters there. Kirk says size, color, and species do not matter. Alexander asks to go with Kirk.

While Kirk and the others are waiting for the serum to take effect, Parmen forces the four, all dressed in Greek clothing, to perform again. Alexander becomes angry after watching the humiliating tricks played upon the crew by his fellow Platonians, and he tries, unsuccessfully, to attack Parmen with a knife.

Kirk uses his new-found telekinetic powers to defeat Parmen and save Alexander's life. Parmen then promises to mend his bullying ways, but Kirk doesn't believe him, and warns Parmen, should he go back on his word, the powers can be recreated by anyone whenever they wish to defeat him.

Kirk promises to send appropriate medical technicians to the planet as long as the Platonians behave themselves, and Alexander requests to go with the Enterprise to start a new life elsewhere in the galaxy.

With Alexander by his side, Kirk contacts the Enterprise and tells Scotty, "I have a little surprise for you. I'm bringing a visitor aboard."

== The kiss ==
The kiss between Kirk and Uhura is sometimes cited as the first white and black interracial kiss portrayed on US television.

The episode features a kiss between James T. Kirk (William Shatner) and Lt. Uhura (Nichelle Nichols) which for many years was described as the first interracial kiss on television.

However, it was not the first interracial kiss on television.

Several takes of the Kirk/Uhura kiss were filmed, with different levels of contact between the actors, and many speculate on which version was used in the final cut of the episode. William Shatner recalls in Star Trek Memories that NBC insisted their lips never touch (the technique of turning their heads away from the camera was used to conceal this). However, Nichelle Nichols insists in her autobiography Beyond Uhura (written in 1994 after Shatner's book) that the kiss was real, even in takes where her head obscures their lips.

When NBC executives learned of the kiss they became concerned it would anger TV stations in the Deep South. There were, however, few if any complaints about the scene. Nichelle Nichols observes that "Plato's Stepchildren" which first aired in November 1968 "received a huge response. We received one of the largest batches of fan mail ever, all of it very positive, with many addressed to me from girls wondering how it felt to kiss Captain Kirk, and many to him from guys wondering the same thing about me. However, almost no one found the kiss offensive" except from a single, mildly negative letter from one white Southerner who wrote: "I am totally opposed to the mixing of the races. However, any time a red-blooded American boy like Captain Kirk gets a beautiful dame in his arms that looks like Uhura, he ain't gonna fight it." Nichols notes that "for me, the most memorable episode of our last season was 'Plato's Stepchildren.'"

== Reception ==
"Where I come from, size, shape or color makes no difference."

— Kirk's line, as quoted by Newsweek (2009)

It was one of several episodes not screened by the BBC because of their "unpleasant" content, including torture and sadism. (The other episodes that were censored in this way were "The Empath", "Whom Gods Destroy" and "Miri".) The BBC viewed Star Trek in part as a children's show and restricted episodes that included overt depictions of torture and sexuality they felt were not appropriate for children. For example, Marta's dance in "Whom Gods Destroy" was deemed too sexual for it to be recommended as children's viewing material.

In 2009, Newsweek pointed out the moral lessons of this episode, in particular Kirk's lines to the oppressed alien. The alien is being mistreated on the planet, and is surprised when Kirk informs him about Starfleet standards.

In 2016, TVLine ranked this as having one of the top twenty moments of Star Trek, noting the scene during which Spock and Kirk are forced to dance by the powerful but cruel aliens.

On the fiftieth anniversary of the first broadcast of Star Trek, National Geographic noted the Kirk-Uhura kiss as "iconic", which they describe as connecting to the period's civil rights issues.

In 2016, Radio Times ranked the kiss between Uhura and Kirk as the 25th best moment in all Star Trek.

In 2016, SyFy noted this episode for actress Nichelle Nichols presentation of Uhura, as having her best scene in Star Trek.

William Shatner, in his 1993 memoir Star Trek Memories, says that aside from the kiss, this was otherwise "a rather forgettable, rather dull episode."

In 2017, Den of Geek ranked "Plato's Stepchildren" the fourth worst episode of the original Star Trek television series.

== Releases ==
This episode was released in Japan on December 21, 1993 as part of the complete season 3 LaserDisc set, Star Trek: Original Series log.3. A trailer for this and the other episodes was also included, and the episode had English and Japanese audio tracks. The cover script was スター・トレック TVサードシーズン

This episode was included in TOS Season 3 remastered DVD box set, with the remastered version of this episode.
