= To Set It Right =

- The Lieutenant episode
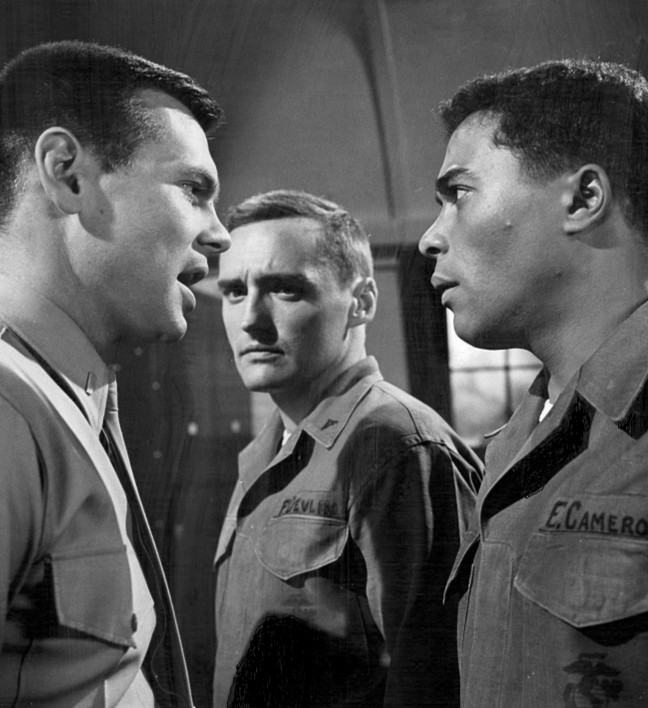
- Publicity photo for "To Set It Right", featuring Gary Lockwood, Dennis Hopper and Don Marshall
- Episode no.: Season 1 Episode 21
- Directed by: Vincent McEveety
- Written by: Lee Erwin
- Original air date: February 22, 1964

Guest appearances
- Dennis Hopper - Cpl. Peter Devlin; Don Marshall - Pvt. Ernest Cameron; John Milford - Sgt. Ben Kagey; Woody Strode - Sgt. Logan Holt; Nichelle Nichols - Norma Bartlett; Preston Pierce - Pvt. Peter Vronsky; Linc Wilson - Pvt. Winston Barlow; Ed McReady - Mr Taylor

Episode chronology
← Previous "Green Water Green Flag"	Next → "In the Highest Tradition"

"To Set It Right" is the 21st episode of the American military drama television series The Lieutenant. Its story is known for a ground-breaking depiction of the lives of an African American couple, and of racism in the U.S. Marine Corps. The series was produced by Gene Roddenberry for broadcast on NBC, and followed the lives of Marines stationed at Camp Pendleton. This episode was written by Lee Erwin, and its guest cast included Dennis Hopper, Don Marshall, Woody Strode, and the screen debut of Nichelle Nichols. In this episode, after a racist altercation between white Cpl. Peter Devlin (Hopper), and black Pvt. Ernest Cameron (Marshall), Lt. William Rice (series lead Gary Lockwood) attempts to settle their issues by first arranging a boxing match and then forcing them to work together on a march.

== Production ==
The Lieutenant was developed in conjunction with the U.S. Defense Department, but following a series of plot points concerning racism within the military, relations became strained. The Pentagon was concerned with the depiction of racist men in uniform in the plot of "To Set It Right", and warned the producers that the airing of the episode could result in the production no longer being able to use the free equipment and extras provided by the Marines. In response, Roddenberry informed the National Association for the Advancement of Colored People, who pressured the network to air the episode. Although some sources say the episode was never broadcast, NBC scheduled it for February 22, 1964, and it was carried in at least some markets; Variety ran a review of the episode two days later. The assistance of the Pentagon was withdrawn, and the series was officially canceled a week later.

== Reception ==
Donald Bogle wrote of the episode in his 2001 book Primetime Blues: African Americans on Network Television, saying that the episode "lost its nerve and ultimately undermined the feelings – the very strong, modern Black perspective – of its character Cameron". This resulted in the character appearing to be "one more angry young negro with unjustified racial hostility".

However, Bogle praised the interactions between Lt. Rice and Norma, saying this was a better articulation of the problems faced by Cameron than those explained by the actual character. Bogle felt that although "To Set It Right" sought to address racial issues, it wanted to avoid upsetting its mainstream viewers.

A videotape of the episode is part of the Paley Center for Media collection in New York, contributed by Gene Roddenberry. It is also available on DVD in the collected episodes of "The Lieutenant".
