= The Lieutenant =

American television series

- Created by: Gene Roddenberry
- Starring: Gary Lockwood; Robert Vaughn; John Milford; Henry Beckman; Richard Anderson; Don Penny; Carmen Phillips; Steve Franken
- Composers: Jeff Alexander; Arthur Morton; Lyn Murray; Harry Sukman
- Country of origin: United States
- Original language: English
- No. of seasons: 1
- No. of episodes: 29

Production
- Running time: 60 minutes
- Production company: Metro-Goldwyn-Mayer Television

Original release
- Network: NBC
- Release: September 14, 1963 – April 18, 1964

The Lieutenant is an American television series, created by Gene Roddenberry. An hour-long drama, it aired on NBC on Saturday evenings in the 1963–1964 television schedule. It was produced by Arena Productions, one of Metro-Goldwyn-Mayer's most successful in-house production companies of the 1960s. Situated at U.S. Marine Corps base Camp Pendleton in California, The Lieutenant focuses on enlisted Marines and officers in peacetime with a Cold War backdrop. The title character is Second Lieutenant William Tiberius Rice, a rifle platoon leader and one of the camp's training instructors.

The series involved a number of actors well known for their other roles, including several who would later appear in Roddenberry's more well known work, Star Trek. The central character—whose middle name would be shared with the character James T. Kirk—was played by Gary Lockwood, who was featured in the second Star Trek pilot "Where No Man Has Gone Before".

== Synopsis ==
Gary Lockwood stars as USMC second lieutenant William Tiberius Rice, a recent graduate of the United States Naval Academy who is assigned his first command, that of a rifle platoon. Rice is a young, educated idealist who still has much to learn from an older mentor. Robert Vaughn played Captain Raymond Rambridge, Rice's company commander, an up-from-the-ranks officer. Richard Anderson, remembered for playing Oscar Goldman in The Six Million Dollar Man and The Bionic Woman, had a recurring role as battalion commander Lieutenant Colonel Steve Hiland. Linda Evans, later known for her roles on The Big Valley and as Krystle Carrington in Dynasty, appeared in several early episodes as Colonel Hiland's daughter Nan, who flirted with Rice. The series focused primarily on Rice's various assignments as a junior officer, which often involved special details or difficult situations. Several of the later episodes featured Rice becoming an undercover investigator with military intelligence, allowing for plots and scenarios which Rice would otherwise not be involved with as a second lieutenant.

== Production and broadcast ==
The episode "To Set It Right" drew attention for its handling of contemporary race issues. It featured a black Marine portrayed by Don Marshall, with Dennis Hopper as a racist white Marine; Nichelle Nichols appeared as the black Marine's fiancée, in her television debut. The U.S. Defense Department, which provided the studio with free production assistance for the series, objected to the unflattering portrayal of racism in the Corps, which reportedly led to production being canceled. Although some sources say the episode was never broadcast, NBC scheduled it for February 22, 1964, and it was carried in at least some markets; Variety ran a review of the episode two days later.

After its original broadcast, The Lieutenant was sparsely rerun in syndication, as its run had not been long enough for episodes to be stripped in daily broadcasts. In 2016, digital subchannel network GetTV aired The Lieutenant on Wednesday evenings at 8 p.m. Eastern Time in a block of four episodes, not following the original airdate order.

The series was released on DVD in two half-season sets by the Warner Archive Collection in 2012. This release includes a feature film version of the episode "To Kill a Man" that was released in international markets.

== Cast members ==
=== Regulars ===
- Gary Lockwood – Second Lieutenant William Tiberius Rice
- Robert Vaughn – Captain Raymond Rambridge
- John Milford – Sergeant Kagey
- Henry Beckman – Major Al Barker
- Richard Anderson – Lieutenant Colonel Steve Hiland
- Don Penny – Lieutenant Stanley Harris
- Chuck Haren – Corporal Sandow
- Carmen Phillips – Lily
- Steve Franken – Lieutenant Samwell 'Sanpan' Panosian
- Chris Noel – a regular female cast member, who played various characters

Vaughn received the same compensation as Lockwood, even though he was usually in only one scene per episode. Vaughn asked both MGM Television and Norman Felton (under whose Arena Productions banner The Lieutenant was being produced) for his own series during the run of The Lieutenant. The result was The Man from U.N.C.L.E., which began the next season and proved to be highly successful.

=== Guest stars ===
Later Star Trek regulars Majel Barrett (who later married Roddenberry), Leonard Nimoy, Nichelle Nichols, and Walter Koenig appeared as guest stars. So did Ricardo Montalbán, who played recurring Star Trek antagonist Khan Noonien Singh. Other Star Trek actors included Paul Comi (appearing in the Star Trek episode "Balance of Terror") and veteran actor James Gregory ("Dagger of the Mind").

Other guest stars include Rip Torn as a drill instructor, Ted Knight as a yeoman, Vic Tayback as a Marine Corps sentry, veteran character actor Denver Pyle as a Marine Corps major, Eddie Albert, Jack Albertson, Edward Asner, Barbara Babcock, Barbara Bain, Clive Clerk, Ina Balin, Marian Collier, Russ Conway, Dennis Cross, Robert Karnes, Paul Newlan, Gregg Palmer, Joe Ploski, Penny Santon, Cosmo Sardo, Tom Simcox, Ray Teal, Garrison True and Kelly Thordsen.

== Episodes ==
No.	Title	Directed by	Written by	Original release date
1	"A Million Miles from Clary"	Don Medford	Ed Waters	September 14, 1963
Platoon morale is threatened when an easygoing enlisted man (Bill Bixby) uses his friendship with Rice to gain favors.
2	"Cool of the Evening"	Robert Gist	Sheldon Stark	September 21, 1963
Rice goes to the aid of a dishonest young woman (Kathryn Hays) when he hears her scream in a dark alley, but then finds himself facing serious charges.
3	"The Proud and the Angry"	Andrew McLaglen	Jerome B. Thomas	September 28, 1963
Rice goes undercover at a boot camp as a private to investigate charges that Sgt. Karl Kasten (Rip Torn) is brutal in his training of new recruits.
4	"The Two Star Giant"	Richard Donner	Beirne Lay, Jr.	October 5, 1963
Rice is mistakenly assigned as an aide to General Stone (Neville Brand) just as the general is ordered to Washington to defend his policies at a Senate hearing.
5	"A Very Private Affair"	Buzz Kulik	Gene Roddenberry	October 12, 1963
Pilot episode: 2ndLt. William T. Rice reports for his first assignment, and is forced to choose between winning the confidence of his new platoon by overlooking a fight or revealing the truth to Capt. Raymond Rambridge.
6	"To Take Up Serpents"	Andrew V. Mclaglen	Jay Simms	October 19, 1963
Rice is assigned to an air base for training and comes to the realization that he has a fear of flying.
7	"A Touching of Hands"	Don Medford	Sy Salkowitz	October 26, 1963
Rice offers sympathy to the lonely wife of a fellow officer (Ina Balin), but soon finds himself the subject of malicious gossip.
8	"Captain Thomson"	Leon Benson	Sheldon Stark	November 2, 1963
A gruff and tactless guerilla warfare instructor (Paul Burke) makes impossible demands on his trainees.
9	"Instant Wedding"	David Alexander	Ellis Marcus	November 9, 1963
Rice tries to protect a fellow officer's girlfriend from the romantic attentions of a Navy officer.
10	"A Troubled Image"	Don Medford	Herman Groves	November 16, 1963
Rice trains a group of Vietnamese combat officers and finds one of them is a beautiful woman.
11	"Fall from a White Horse"	John Brahm	George Eckstein	November 30, 1963
Rice is asked to provide legal defense by a fellow Marine officer (Andrew Prine) who is accused in a hit-and-run accident and is in danger of being court-martialed.
12	"Alert!"	Don Taylor	Lee Erwin	December 14, 1963
Rice falls in love with a business executive's daughter (Sharon Farrell) who gives him an ultimatum of either leaving the Marine Corps or breaking off the relationship.
13	"The Art of Discipline"	Arnold Butler	Archie L. Tegland	December 21, 1963
Rice loses control of his new platoon when he relaxes discipline to win friends.
14	"The Alien"	Michael O'Herlihy	Story by : George Eckstein; Teleplay by : "Robert Wesley"	December 28, 1963
Rambridge conducts a double courtship in an effort to marry a stewardess (Madlyn Rhue) as quickly as possible in order to adopt a Korean orphan.
15	"O'Rourke"	E. W. Swackhammer	Jay Simms	January 4, 1964
A famous author (Eddie Albert) decides to prove the contemporary Marine Corps is far less effective than it was during World War II.
16	"Gone the Sun"	James Goldstone	Robert Dozier	January 18, 1964
Returning to his hometown while escorting a dead soldier, Rice is blamed for the death of a Marine during maneuvers by the parents of the deceased man, and connects with the beautiful sister (Sherry Jackson) of a friend. Strother Martin plays a taxi driver.
17	"Between Music and Laughter"	Vincent McEveety	Sy Salkowitz	January 25, 1964
A party girl (Patricia Crowley) asks Rice to help her win back the affections of her ex-husband, Captain Rambridge.
18	"Interlude"	Richard Donner	Story by : Robert E. Thompson; Teleplay by : Paul Schneider & Margaret Schneider	February 1, 1964
Rice's career in the Marine Corps is threatened when he is paralyzed in an automobile accident, but he finds love during his rehabilitation with a woman (Joanna Moore) dying of a brain tumor.
19	"Capp's Lady"	David Alexander	Robert J. Shaw	February 8, 1964
Rice makes an effort to warn Sgt. Horace Capp (James Gregory) that the woman he plans to marry has both a notorious reputation and a police record.
20	"Green Water Green Flag"	Leon Benson	Sy Salkowitz	February 15, 1964
Rice meets Lt. Joe Worth, an old adversary just when he is suddenly given command of important maneuvers due to Rambridge's appendicitis.
21	"To Set It Right"	Vincent McEveety	Lee Erwin	N/A
Rice tries to play peacemaker when he has to resolve a racial dispute between two young members (Dennis Hopper and Don Marshall) of his platoon. Nichelle Nichols plays the black soldier's fiancee.
22	"In the Highest Tradition"	Marc Daniels	Blanche Hanalis	February 29, 1964
Rice is assigned as a technical advisor with a film crew making a movie about a Marine lieutenant in World War II. Leonard Nimoy plays a Hollywood producer and actor. Majel Barrett plays Nimoy's assistant.
23	"Tour of Duty"	Andrew V. McLaughlin	Art Wallace	March 7, 1964
A Marine (Ricardo Montalbán) returns from overseas and learns that his wife was killed while riding with another man, then takes advantage of Rice's sympathies.
24	"Lament for a Dead Goldbrick"	Robert Butler	Sy Salkowitz	March 14, 1964
A newspaper reporter (Robert Duvall) writing an exposé of Marine training methods holds Rice responsible for the accidental death of a Marine.
25	"Man with an Edge"	Vincent McEveety	Story by : Beirne Lay, Jr. Teleplay by : Beirne Lay, Jr. and Lee Erwin	March 21, 1964
Rice loses his girlfriend to a Naval Academy football All-American (Chad Everett), who also happens to be the nephew of the colonel.
26	"Operation Actress"	Leonard Horn	Robert J. Shaw	March 28, 1964
Rice is shocked when a conniving Hollywood actress (Leslie Parrish) announces that she is going to marry him.
27	"Mother Enemy"	Vincent McEveety	Robert J. Shaw	April 4, 1964
Rice recommends Sgt. John Delwyn (Walter Koenig) for officer's school, but then discovers that the man's mother is a leading member of the American Communist party.
28	"The War Called Peace"	Andrew V. McLaughlin	Anthony Wilson	April 11, 1964
Rice is assigned to run a surreptitious check on carelessness in security measures that has developed on a top-secret scientific project called "The War Called Peace."
29	"To Kill a Man"	Vincent McEveety	Gene Roddenberry	April 18, 1964
Rice is assigned to deliver top-secret military information to combat troops in Vietnam, but when his helicopter is shot down, he and a Vietnamese aide (James Shigeta) are forced to fight their way back. A feature-film version of this episode was released internationally, though not in the United States.

== In other media ==
Dell Comics published a single issue tie-in comic book.

Transogram published a board game based on the series in 1963.
