= Nichelle Nichols =

American actress (1932–2022)

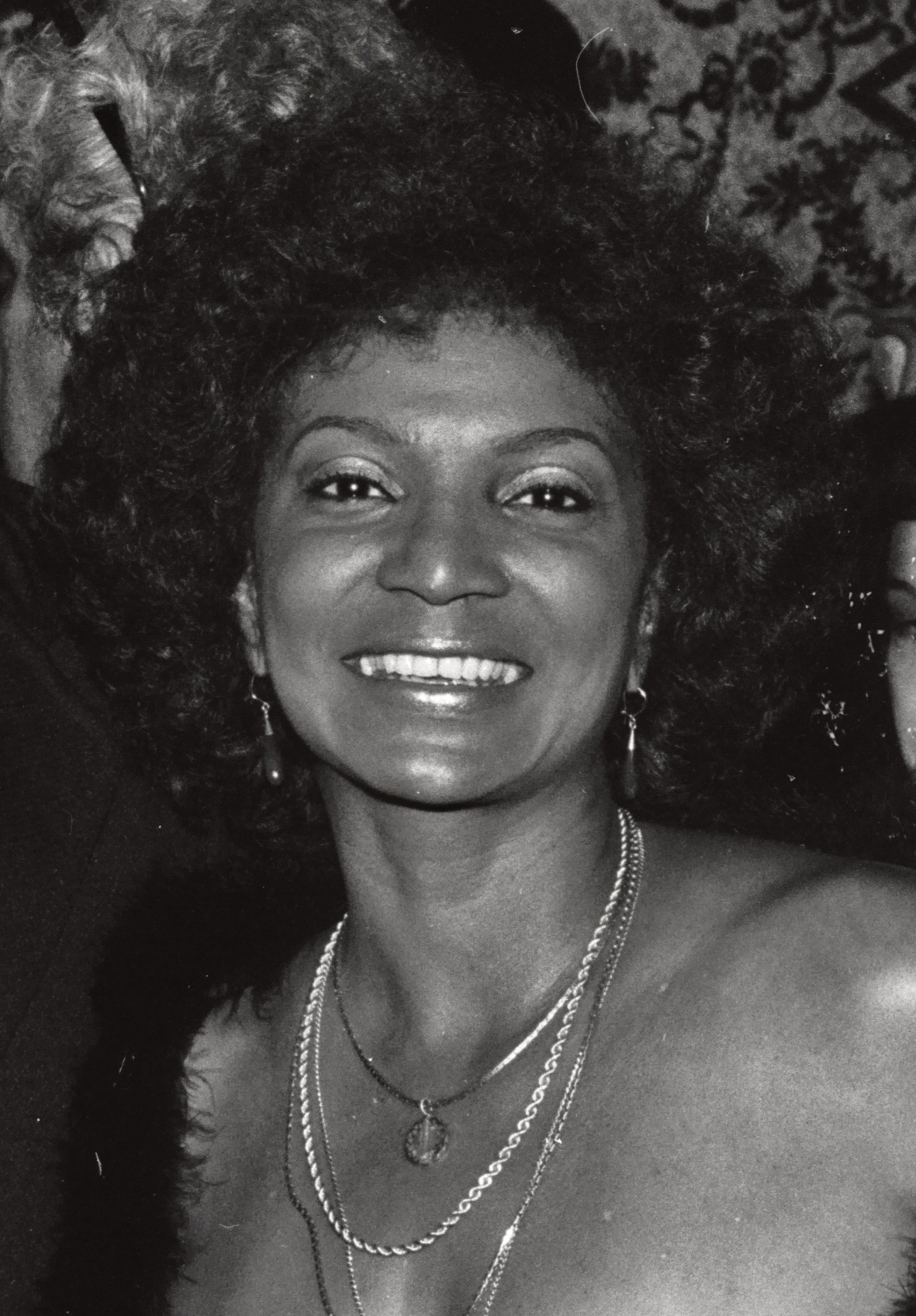
- Nichols in 1979
- Born: Grace Dell Nichols; December 28, 1932; Robbins, Illinois, U.S.
- Died: July 30, 2022 (aged 89); Silver City, New Mexico, U.S.
- Occupations: Actress; singer; dancer
- Years active: 1959–2020
- Notable credit: Nyota Uhura in Star Trek
- Spouses: Foster Johnson (m. 1951; div. 1951); Duke Mondy (m. 1968; div. 1972)
- Children: Kyle Johnson

Grace Dell "Nichelle" Nichols (/nɪˈʃɛl/ nish-EL; December 28, 1932 – July 30, 2022) was an American actress, singer, and dancer whose portrayal of Uhura in Star Trek and its film sequels was groundbreaking for African-American actresses on American television. From 1977 to 2015, she volunteered her time to promote NASA's programs and recruit diverse astronauts, including some of the first female and ethnic minority astronauts.

Born in the Chicago suburb of Robbins, she trained in dance, and began her career as a dancer, singer, and model in Chicago. As an actor, she appeared on stage, on television, and in film.

== Early life ==
Grace Dell "Nichelle" Nichols was born the third of six children on December 28, 1932, in Robbins, Illinois, a suburb of Chicago, to Samuel Earl Nichols, a factory worker who was elected both town mayor of Robbins in 1929 and its chief magistrate, and his wife, Lishia (Parks) Nichols, a homemaker. Disliking her name, Nichols asked her parents for a new one; they suggested Nichelle, which they said meant "victorious maiden" (from Nike and the suffix -elle). The family later moved into an apartment in the Woodlawn neighborhood of Chicago, where Nichols attended Englewood High School, graduating in 1951. From age 12, she studied dance at the Chicago Ballet Academy.

== Career ==
Nichols began her professional career as a singer and dancer in Chicago. She then toured the United States and Canada with the bands of Duke Ellington and Lionel Hampton. In 1959, she appeared as the principal dancer in the film version of Porgy and Bess. Her acting break was an appearance in Kicks and Co., Oscar Brown's highly touted but ill-fated 1961 musical. In the thinly veiled satire of Playboy magazine, she played Hazel Sharpe, a voluptuous campus queen, who was tempted by the devil and Orgy Magazine to become "Orgy Maiden of the Month". Although the play closed after a short run in Chicago, Nichols attracted the attention of Hugh Hefner, the publisher of Playboy, who booked her as a singer for his Chicago Playboy Club. She also appeared as Carmen for a Chicago stock company production of Carmen Jones and performed in a New York production of Porgy and Bess. Between acting and singing engagements, she did occasional modeling.

In January 1967, Nichols was also featured on the cover of Ebony and had two feature articles in it in five years. She continued touring the U.S., Canada, and Europe as a singer with Duke Ellington and Lionel Hampton. On the West Coast, she appeared in The Roar of the Greasepaint and For My People, and garnered high praise for her performance in the James Baldwin play Blues for Mister Charlie. Prior to being cast as Lieutenant Uhura in Star Trek, Nichols was a guest actress on television producer Gene Roddenberry's first series, The Lieutenant (1964), in the episode "To Set It Right", which dealt with racial prejudice.

=== Star Trek ===
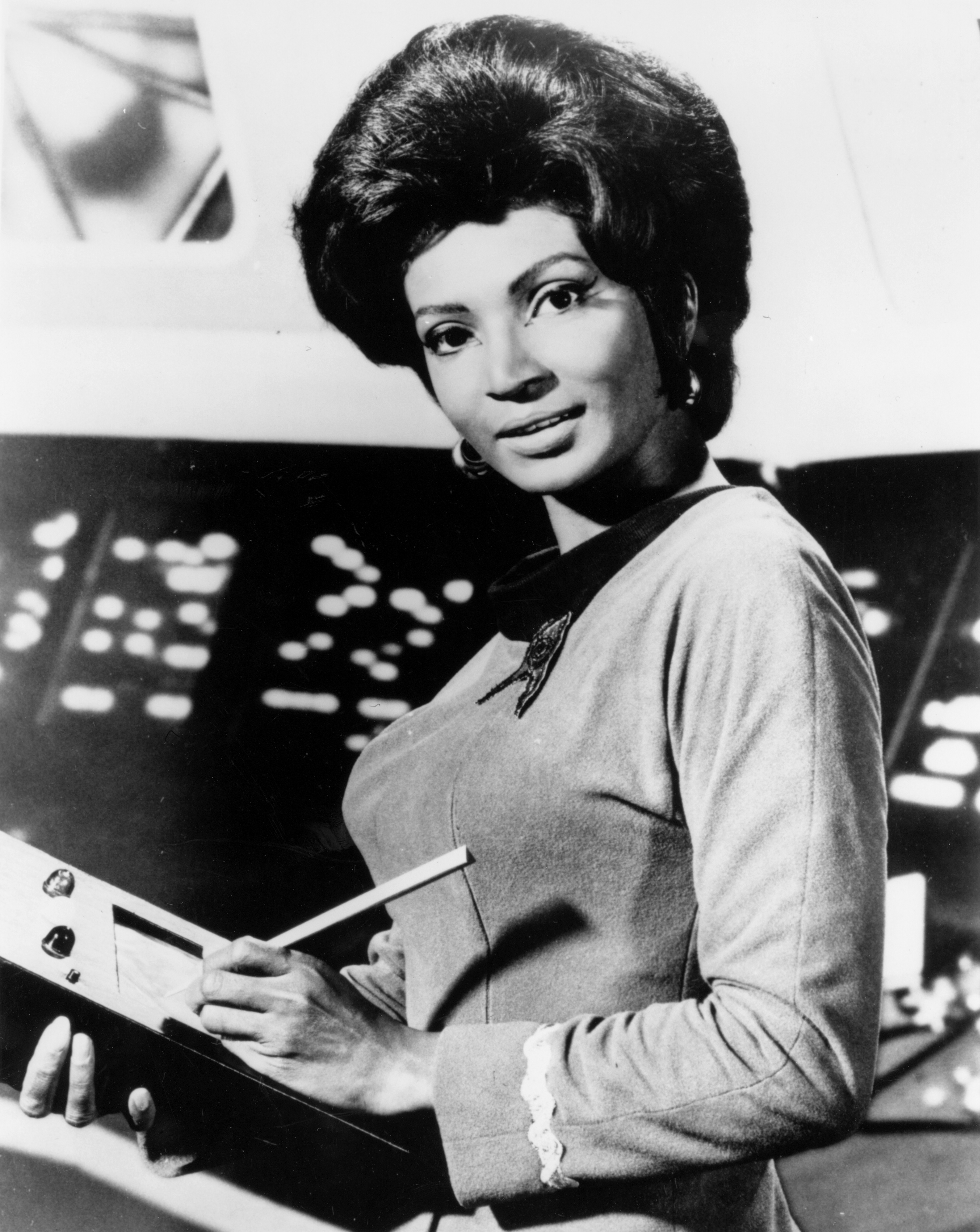
Nichols as Lieutenant Nyota Uhura on Star Trek, 1967

On Star Trek, Nichols was one of the first black women featured in a major television series. Her prominent supporting role as a bridge officer was unprecedented.

She was once tempted to leave the series, but a conversation with Martin Luther King Jr. changed her mind. Towards the end of the first season, Nichols was offered a role on Broadway. Preferring the stage to the television studio, she decided to take the role. Nichols went to Roddenberry's office, told him that she planned to leave, and handed him her resignation letter. Unable to convince her to stay, Roddenberry told her to take the weekend off, and if she still felt she should leave, he would give her his blessing. That weekend, Nichols attended a banquet organized by the NAACP, where she was informed that a fan wanted to meet her:

I thought it was a Trekkie, and so I said, "Sure." I looked across the room and whoever the fan was had to wait because there was Dr. Martin Luther King walking towards me with this big grin on his face. He reached out to me and said, "Yes, Ms. Nichols, I am your greatest fan." He said that Star Trek was the only show that his wife Coretta and he would allow their three little children to stay up and watch. [She told King about her plans to leave the series because she wanted to take a role that was tied to Broadway.] I never got to tell him why, because he said, "You cannot, you cannot... For the first time on television, we will be seen as we should be seen every day—as intelligent, quality, beautiful people who can sing, dance, and go to space… who are professors, lawyers… If you leave, that door can be closed, because your role is not a black role and is not a female role; he can fill it with anybody, even an alien."

Calling Nichols a "vital role model", King compared her work on the series to the marches of the ongoing civil rights movement. The next day, she returned to Roddenberry's office to tell him she would stay. When she told Roddenberry what King had said, tears came to his eyes.

Former NASA astronaut Mae Jemison cited Nichols' role of Lieutenant Uhura as her inspiration for becoming an astronaut. Whoopi Goldberg has also spoken of Nichols' influence, saying she asked for a role on Star Trek: The Next Generation, and her character Guinan was specially created, while Jemison appeared on an episode of the series.

In her role as Lieutenant Uhura, Nichols kissed white actor William Shatner (as Captain James T. Kirk) in the November 22, 1968, Star Trek episode "Plato's Stepchildren." It has been cited as the first example of an interracial kiss on U.S. television, although several earlier instances have been identified. The Shatner/Nichols kiss was considered groundbreaking, though it was portrayed as having been forced by alien telekinesis. The scene garnered some praise and almost no dissent. In her autobiography Beyond Uhura, Star Trek and Other Memories, Nichols cited a letter from a white Southerner who wrote, "I am totally opposed to the mixing of the races. However, any time a red-blooded American boy like Captain Kirk gets a beautiful dame in his arms that looks like Uhura, he ain't gonna fight it." During the Comedy Central Roast of Shatner on August 20, 2006, Nichols jokingly referred to the kiss and said, "What do you say, let's make a little more TV history ... and kiss my black ass! "

Despite the series' cancellation in 1969, Star Trek continued to play a part in Nichols' life. She provided the voice of Uhura in Star Trek: The Animated Series. In one episode, "The Lorelei Signal", Uhura assumes command of the Enterprise. Nichols noted in her autobiography her frustration that this never happened on the original series. She co-starred in six Star Trek films, culminating in Star Trek VI: The Undiscovered Country (1991).

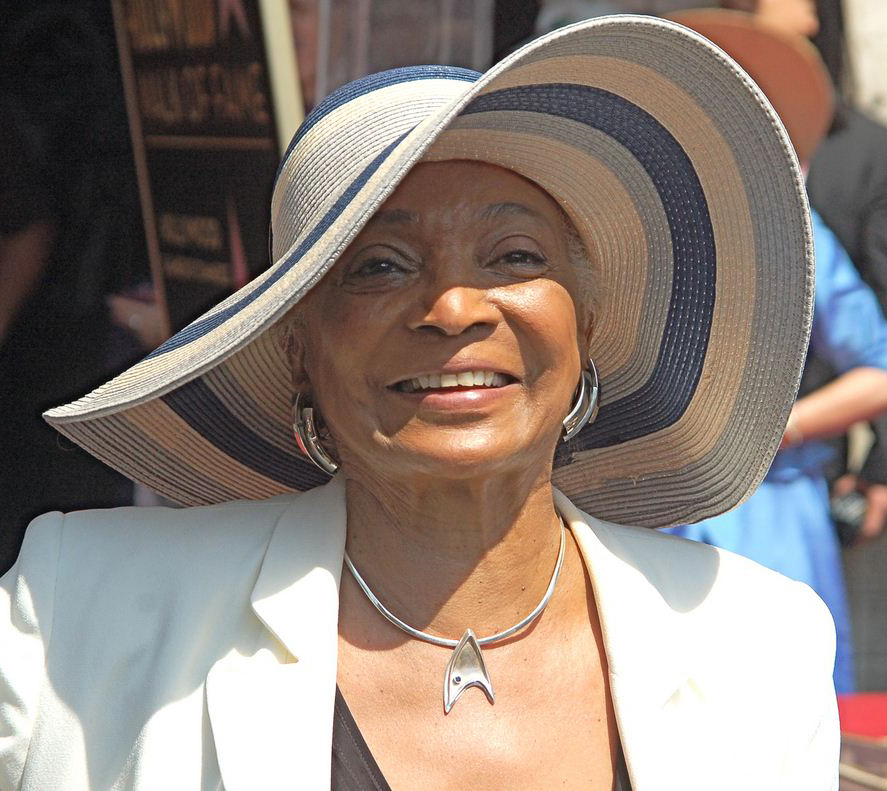
Nichols in 2012

In 1994, Nichols published her autobiography, Beyond Uhura: Star Trek and Other Memories. In it, she claimed that the role of Peggy Fair in the television series Mannix was offered to her during the final season of Star Trek, but producer Gene Roddenberry refused to release her from her contract. Between the end of the original series and the Star Trek animated series and feature films, Nichols appeared in small television and film roles. She briefly appeared as a secretary in Doctor, You've Got to Be Kidding! (1967), and portrayed Dorienda, a foul-mouthed madam in Truck Turner (1974) opposite Isaac Hayes, her only appearance in a blaxploitation film.

Nichols appeared in animated form as one of Al Gore's Vice Presidential Action Rangers in the "Anthology of Interest I" episode of Futurama, and she provided the voice of her own head in a glass jar in the episode "Where No Fan Has Gone Before.” She voiced the recurring role of Elisa Maza's mother Diane Maza in the animated series Gargoyles, and played Thoth Khepera in an episode of Batman: The Animated Series. In 2004, she provided the voice for herself in The Simpsons episode "Simple Simpson.” In the comedy film Snow Dogs (2002), she appeared as the mother of the male lead, played by Cuba Gooding Jr. In 2006, she played the title character in the film Lady Magdalene's, the madam of a legal Nevada brothel in tax default. She also served as executive producer and choreographer and sang three songs in the film, two of which she composed. She was twice nominated for the Chicago theatrical Sarah Siddons Award for Best Actress, first for her portrayal of Hazel Sharpe in Kicks and Co. and again for her performance in The Blacks.

Nichols had a recurring role on the second season of the NBC drama Heroes, first in the episode "Kindred", which aired October 8, 2007. She portrayed Nana Dawson, the matriarch of a New Orleans family financially and personally devastated by Hurricane Katrina, who cares for her orphaned grandchildren and her great-nephew, series regular Micah Sanders. In 2008, Nichols starred in the film The Torturer, playing the role of a psychiatrist. In 2009, she joined the cast of The Cabonauts, a sci-fi musical comedy that debuted on DailyMotion. Playing CJ, the CEO of the Cabonauts Inc, she was also featured singing and dancing. On August 30, 2016, she was introduced as the aging mother of Neil Winters on the long-running soap opera The Young and the Restless. She received her first Daytime Emmy nomination for "Outstanding Guest Performer in a Drama Series" for the role on March 22, 2017.

=== Music ===
Nichols released two music albums: Down to Earth, a collection of standards released in 1967, during the original run of Star Trek; and Out of This World, released in 1991, a more rock-oriented album themed around Star Trek and space exploration.

As Uhura, Nichols sang on the Star Trek episodes "Charlie X," "The Changeling", and "The Conscience of the King".

== Work with NASA ==
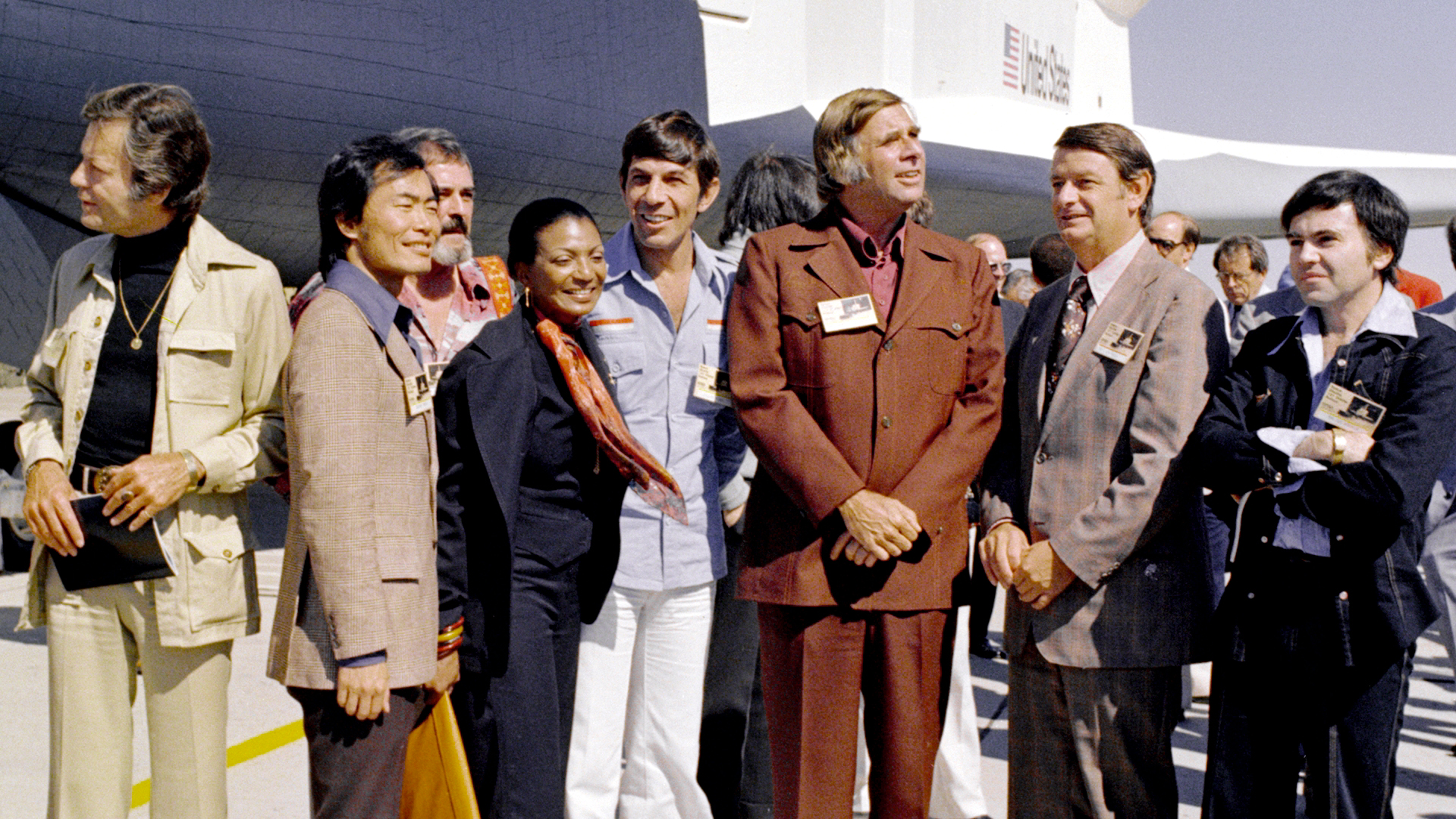
Nichols (fourth from the left) with most of the cast of Star Trek visiting the Space Shuttle Enterprise at the Rockwell International plant at Palmdale, California, U.S., 1976

After the cancellation of Star Trek, Nichols volunteered her time in a special project with NASA to recruit minority and female personnel for the space agency. She began this work by making an affiliation between NASA and a company that she helped to run, Women in Motion.

The program was a success. Among those recruited were Dr. Sally Ride, the first American female astronaut, and United States Air Force Colonel Guion Bluford, the first African American to go into space, as well as Dr. Judith Resnik and Dr. Ronald McNair, who both flew successful missions during the Space Shuttle program before their deaths in the Space Shuttle Challenger disaster on January 28, 1986. Recruits also included Charles Bolden, the former NASA administrator and veteran of four shuttle missions, Frederick D. Gregory, former deputy administrator and a veteran of three shuttle missions, and Lori Garver, former deputy administrator. An enthusiastic advocate of space exploration, Nichols served from the mid-1980s on the board of governors of the National Space Institute (today's National Space Society), a nonprofit, educational, space advocacy organization.

In late 2015, Nichols flew aboard NASA's Stratospheric Observatory for Infrared Astronomy Boeing 747SP, which analyzed the atmospheres of Mars and Saturn on an eight-hour, high-altitude mission. She was also a special guest at the Jet Propulsion Laboratory in Pasadena, California, on July 17, 1976, to view the Viking 1 soft landing on Mars. Along with the other cast members from the original Star Trek series, she attended the christening of the first space shuttle, Enterprise, at the North American Rockwell assembly facility in Palmdale, California. On July 14, 2010, she toured the space shuttle simulator and Mission Control at the Johnson Space Center.

Nichols' work with NASA is given significant focus in the documentary, Woman in Motion, about her life.

== Personal life ==
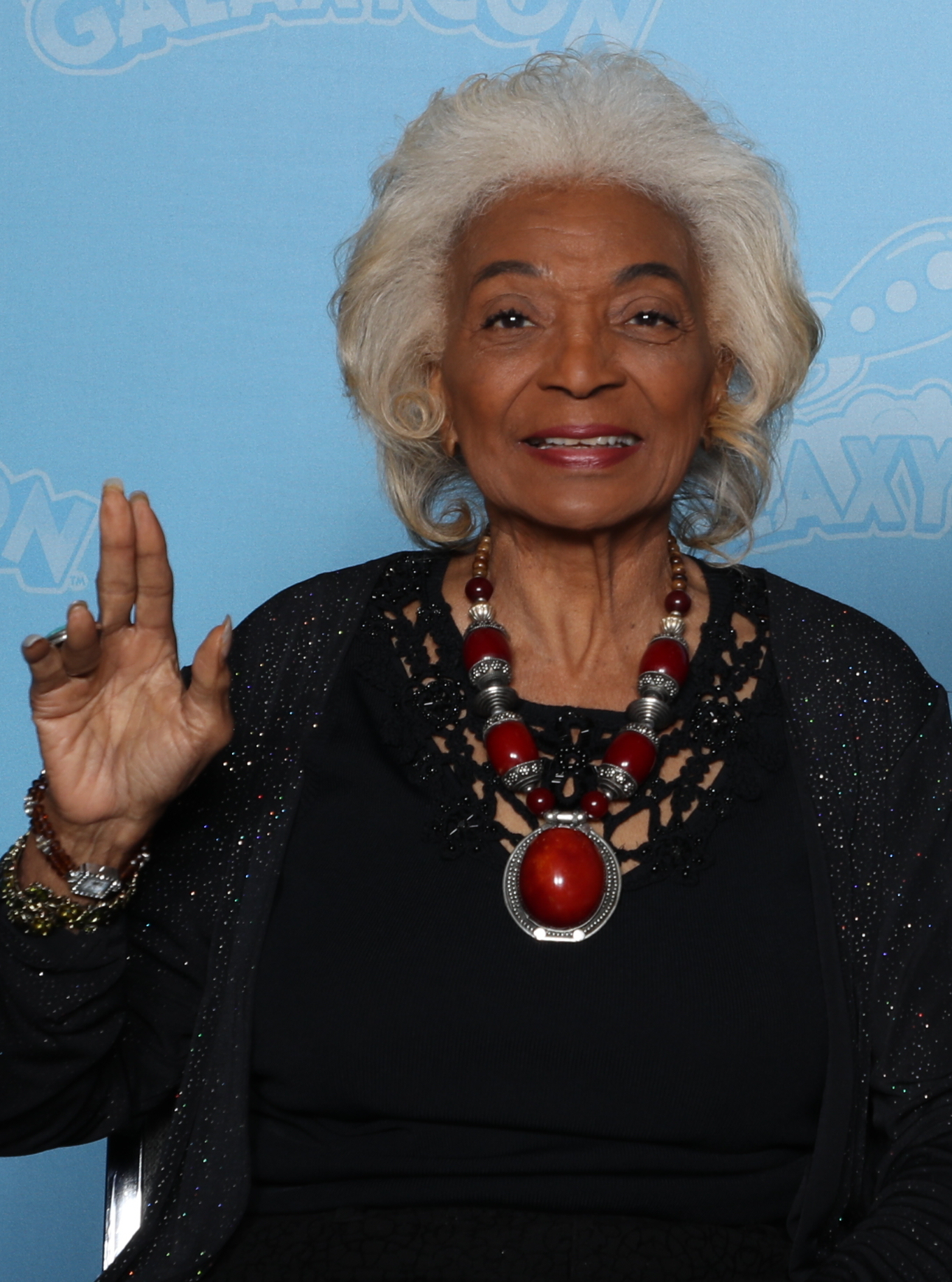
Nichols in 2019

In her autobiography, Nichols wrote that she was romantically involved with Star Trek creator Gene Roddenberry for a few years in the 1960s. She said the affair ended well before Star Trek began, when she realized Roddenberry was also involved with her acquaintance Majel Hudec (known as Majel Barrett).

When Roddenberry's health was fading, Nichols co-wrote a song for him, "Gene", which she sang at his memorial service.

She also wrote that she had "a short, stormy, exciting relationship" with Sammy Davis Jr. in 1959.

Nichols married twice—first to dancer Foster Johnson, whom she married in 1951 and divorced the same year. They had one child together, Kyle Johnson, who was born August 14, 1951. She married Duke Mondy in 1968; they divorced in 1972.

Nichols' younger brother, Thomas, was a member of the Heaven's Gate cult for 20 years. He died on March 26, 1997, in the cult's mass suicide that purposefully coincided with the passing of Comet Hale–Bopp. Thomas frequently identified himself as Nichelle's brother in promotional materials released by the cult.

Nichols served as matron of honor at the wedding of her Star Trek co-star George Takei to Brad Altman in September 2008.

On February 29, 2012, Nichols met with President Barack Obama in the Oval Office. She later tweeted, "…[President] Obama was quoted as saying that he'd had a crush on me when he was younger… I asked about that, and he proudly confirmed it! President Obama also confirmed for me that he was definitely a Trekker! How wonderful is that?!"

=== Health and death ===
In June 2015, Nichols suffered a mild stroke at her Los Angeles home and was admitted to a Los Angeles-area hospital. A magnetic resonance imaging scan confirmed a small stroke had occurred, and she began inpatient therapy. In early 2018, she was diagnosed with dementia, and subsequently announced her retirement from convention appearances.

Following a legal dispute over the actions of her manager-turned-caretaker Gilbert Bell, her son Kyle Johnson filed for conservatorship in 2018. Before a court granted his petition in January 2019, Nichols' friend Angelique Fawcette, who had already expressed concern in 2017 over Bell's control of access to her, pressed for visitation rights, including by opposing Johnson's petition. That dispute, and a 2019 court case by Bell over being evicted from the guesthouse on Nichols' property, were both ongoing as of August 2021.

Nichols died of heart failure in Silver City, New Mexico, on July 30, 2022, at the age of 89, and her ashes were launched into deep space along with those of Majel Barrett and Douglas Trumbull.

In June 2026, her family was awarded $13 million in a wrongful death lawsuit.

== Recognition ==
In 1982, Robert A. Heinlein dedicated his novel Friday to her. Asteroid 68410 Nichols is named in her honor.

In 1992, she was awarded a star on the Hollywood Walk of Fame for her contribution to television. In 1999, Nichols was awarded a Goldene Kamera for Kultstar des Jahrhunderts (Cult Star of the Century). In 2010, Nichols received an honorary degree from Los Angeles Mission College. Nichols received The Life Career Award from the Academy of Science Fiction, Fantasy and Horror Films in 2016, the first woman to receive it. The award was presented as part of the 42nd Saturn Awards ceremony. Nichols was awarded the Inkpot Award in 2018.

Nichols was an honorary member of Alpha Kappa Alpha sorority.

Udea nicholsae, a species of snout moths, was named in her honor.

The second season of Star Trek: Strange New Worlds began with a dedication before the credits referencing one of her recurring lines from the original series: "For Nichelle, who was first through the door and showed us the stars. Hailing frequencies forever open..."

== Filmography ==
=== Films ===
Year	Title	Role	Notes
1959	Porgy and Bess	Dancer	Uncredited
1966	Tarzan's Deadly Silence	Ruana	
1966	Made in Paris	Salon customer	Uncredited extra
1966	Mister Buddwing	Dice Player	
1967	Doctor, You've Got to Be Kidding!	Jenny Ribbock	
1974	Truck Turner	Dorinda	
1979	Star Trek: The Motion Picture	Nyota Uhura	
1982	Star Trek II: The Wrath of Khan	Nyota Uhura	
1984	Star Trek III: The Search for Spock	Nyota Uhura	
1986	The Supernaturals	Sgt. Leona Hawkins	
1986	Star Trek IV: The Voyage Home	Nyota Uhura	
1989	Star Trek V: The Final Frontier	Nyota Uhura	
1991	Star Trek VI: The Undiscovered Country	Nyota Uhura	
1995	The Adventures of Captain Zoom in Outer Space	Sagan	
2002	Snow Dogs	Amelia Brooks	
2004	Surge of Power: The Stuff of Heroes	Omen	
2005	Are We There Yet?	Miss Mable	
2008	Lady Magdalene's	Lady Magdalene / Maggie	
2008	Tru Loved	Grandmother	
2008	The Torturer	Doc	
2008	Star Trek: Of Gods and Men	Captain Nyota Uhura	
2012	This Bitter Earth	Clara Watkins	
2018	The White Orchid	Teresa	
2018	American Nightmares	Mystic Woman	
2020	Unbelievable!!!!!	Sensei / Aunt Petunia	
2020	Star Trek: First Frontier	Nyota Uhura	Fan film

=== Television ===
Year	Title	Role	Notes
1964	The Lieutenant	Norma Bartlett	Episode: "To Set It Right"
1966	Peyton Place	Nurse	2 episodes
1966	Tarzan	Ruana	2 episodes
1966–1969	Star Trek	Nyota Uhura	Main role
1970	Insight	Ellie	Episode: "Old King Cole"
1973–1974	Star Trek: The Animated Series	Nyota Uhura / Additional voices	Main role
1984	Antony and Cleopatra	Charmian	TV film
1988	Head of the Class	Nichelle Nichols	Episode: "For Better, for Worse"
1993	ABC Weekend Special	SS Stella	Episode: "Commander Toad in Space"
1994	Batman: The Animated Series	Thoth Khepera (voice)	Episode: "Avatar"
1994–1996	Gargoyles	Diane Maza (voice)	4 episodes
1996	Star Trek: Deep Space Nine	Nyota Uhura	Episode: "Trials and Tribble-ations"; archive footage
1997	Spider-Man: The Animated Series	Miriam (voice)	2 episodes
2000–2002	Futurama	Herself (voice)	2 episodes ("Anthology of Interest I" and "Where No Fan Has Gone Before")
2000	G vs E	Henry's Mother	Episode: "Henry's Mother"
2000	Buzz Lightyear of Star Command	Chief (voice)	Episode: "The Yukari Imprint"
2004	The Simpsons	Herself (voice)	Episode: "Simple Simpson"
2007	Heroes	Nana Dawson	Recurring role
2009	The Cabonauts	CJ	Episode: "Pilot"
2010	Scooby-Doo! Curse of the Lake Monster	Senator	TV film
2016	The Young and the Restless	Lucinda Winters	4 episodes
2017	Star Trek: Renegades	Admiral Grace Jemison	Episode: "The Requiem"; fan production
2017	Downward Dog	Deejay DeVine	Episode: "Old"
2017	Sharknado 5: Global Swarming	Sec. General Starr	TV film
2020	Space Command	Octavia Butler	Episode: "Ripple Effect"
2021	12 to Midnight	Devorah	Episode: "What Is and What Never Should Be"
2021	Renegades: Ominara	Ominara (elder)	42-minute proof-of-concept pilot film for TV
2022	Star Trek: Prodigy	Nyota Uhura (voice)	Episode: "Kobayashi"; archive audio

=== Video games and theme park attractions ===
Year	Title	Role	Notes
1994	Star Trek: 25th Anniversary	Nyota Uhura (voice)	Video games (CD-ROM versions)
1995	Star Trek: Judgment Rites	Nyota Uhura (voice)	Video games (CD-ROM versions)
1996–1998	Star Trek Adventure	Nyota Uhura	Amusement park feature; appeared in several revisions

== Books ==
Title	Publisher	Date	ISBN	Notes
Beyond Uhura	G. P. Putnam's Sons	October 19, 1994	0-399-13993-1	
Saturn's Child	Penguin	October 17, 1995	0-399-14113-8	with Margaret Wander Bonanno
Saturna's Quest	Planet X Books	2002	978-0971915404	with Jim Meechan

== Discography ==
- Down to Earth (Epic Records, 1967)
- Uhura Sings (aR-Way Productions, 1986)
- Out of this World (GNP Crescendo, 1991)

== See also ==
- Kirk and Uhura's kiss
