= The World Next Door =

The World Next Door may refer to:

- The World Next Door (video game), a 2019 indie video game
- The World Next Door (novel), a 1990 science fiction novel by Brad Ferguson
- The World Next Door (The Twilight Zone), a 1986 episode of The Twilight Zone
