= The Outcast (Star Trek: The Next Generation) =

- Star Trek: The Next Generation episode
- Episode no.: Season 5 Episode 17
- Directed by: Robert Scheerer
- Written by: Jeri Taylor
- Production code: 217
- Original air date: March 16, 1992

Guest appearances
- Callan White as Krite; Megan Cole as Noor; Melinda Culea as Soren

Episode chronology
← Previous "Ethics"	Next → "Cause and Effect"
- Star Trek: The Next Generation season 5

"The Outcast" is the 117th episode of the American science fiction television series Star Trek: The Next Generation. It is the seventeenth episode of the fifth season.

In this episode, Riker falls in love with Soren, a member of an androgynous race which finds gender specificity unacceptable.

== Plot ==
The Enterprise is contacted by a humanoid race called the J'naii, a species with no gender. They ask the crew for help in finding a shuttle which has gone missing. It is theorized that the shuttle disappeared into a pocket of null space, which drains energy rapidly. In short order, a rescue mission is planned, for which Riker volunteers to pilot a shuttle to retrieve the shuttle crew. A member of the J'naii named Soren insists on accompanying Riker, acting as a co-pilot. Soren proves to be a good pilot. Riker and Soren share a meal and become more comfortable with each other. They are interrupted by another J'naii, and Soren leaves quickly.

While the pair is charting the null space, the shuttle is damaged and Soren is injured. While being treated by Dr. Crusher, Soren asks her several questions about female gender identification. While Soren and Riker work on the shuttle, Soren confesses that she is attracted to Riker and states that she has a female gender identity. Soren explains that the J'naii are an androgynous species that view the expression of any sort of male or female gender, and especially sexual liaisons, as a sexual perversion. According to their official doctrine, the J'naii had evolved beyond gender and thus view the idea of male/female sexuality as primitive. Those among the J'naii who view themselves as possessing gender are ridiculed, outcast, and forced to undergo "psychotectic therapy" – a form of conversion therapy meant to remediate gender-specificity and allow acceptance back into J'naii society.

The relationship between Riker and Soren grows and is eventually discovered. Soren is put on trial, but before she answers to the charges, Riker bursts in and attempts to take the blame for the situation. Soren foils his attempt and proceeds to passionately defend herself and express her outrage at what their society does to those who express male or female identities. J'naii diplomats force Soren to undergo psychotectic therapy, citing reformed citizens' newfound happiness and desire to be "normal". Riker's emotions and love for Soren grow and he decides that he cannot leave Soren to this fate. He tries to explain the situation to Picard, who is sympathetic to Riker but says that he cannot sanction a rescue mission as it violates the Prime Directive, not to mention Riker throwing away his career. Worf visits Riker in his quarters and offers to go with him on an "unannounced visit" to rescue Soren, since he is unwilling to let Riker face the task alone. When Riker and Worf beam down to the planet to rescue Soren, he realizes that the therapy has already been performed. Soren refuses to go with him, claiming that they are now happy and were sick during their affair with Riker. Soren apologizes to Riker, who returns dejectedly to the Enterprise with Worf.

== Background ==
Given the Star Trek franchise's groundbreaking history in including racially diverse characters and scenarios, many in the LGBT community felt that The Next Generation (TNG) was overdue to include characters and issues that related to LGBT rights. After an earlier TNG episode that featured parallels to the AIDS crisis was shelved, "The Outcast" was intended to be the episode that finally acknowledged non-heterosexual relationships. Before he died, franchise creator Gene Roddenberry had expressed support for having LGBT characters being written into the series. While no such characters were officially included, this episode was designed to comment on sexual identity-based prejudice.

The episode was met with both praise and criticism from the LGBT community. In the case of the latter, criticism came from people who felt that it sanctioned the brainwashing therapy to which Soren was subjected, and others who felt that the creative staff abdicated their responsibility to explore the issue. Some thought the episode too timid, using allegory in lieu of explicitly acknowledging gay relationships, while others critiqued the scenario of a genderless world where heterosexuality was persecuted as the epitome of conservative fears.

Actor Jonathan Frakes, who played Riker, mused that Soren could have been more male-like, and thought a man should have been cast in the role.

== Reception ==
In 2017, Den of Geek ranked this episode as one of top 25 "must watch" episodes of Star Trek: The Next Generation.

== See also ==
- Sexuality in Star Trek

== Bibliography ==
- Star Trek The Next Generation DVD set, volume 5, disc 5, selection 1.
