= Kirk/Spock =

Star Trek characters in slash fiction

This scene from Star Trek: The Motion Picture (1979) has been pointed to as supporting a homoerotic interpretation of Kirk and Spock's relationship.

Kirk/Spock, commonly abbreviated as K/S, or more recently called Spirk and referring to the characters James T. Kirk and Spock from Star Trek, is a popular pair in slash fiction. According to slash fiction scholar Henry Jenkins, it may have been the first slash pairing. Early in the history of Star Trek fan fiction, a few fan writers started writing about a romantic and sexual relationship between Kirk and Spock, suggesting a romantic or sexual element to the characters' friendship. As of 1998, most academic studies on slash fiction focused on Kirk/Spock, as Star Trek was by that point one of the longest-lived and most prosperous subjects of slash fiction, while its mainstream popularity made it one of the most accessible titles for academics and their audience. K/S was created and developed largely independently from the influence of other slash fiction, with most of the conventions of the slash genre seeing their debut first in K/S slash.

== Origins and creators' responses ==
Many homosocial scenes between Kirk and Spock have been interpreted by some fans as having significant homoerotic undertones. "Amok Time", the first episode of the show's second season, which aired in September 1967, was an early influence on the pairing, inspiring early fans to begin writing Kirk/Spock fanfiction. In Star Trek: The Motion Picture, Spock realizes that emotions "play an important part in the richness of life". In a particular scene from the film, Spock, lying down in sickbay, clasps Kirk's hand and says that he understands "this simple feeling". Woledge points out that both the gesture and the words are "ambiguous", and can be interpreted as homoerotic. Eye contact and gestures throughout the series have also been cited as being part of a homoerotic subtext in their relationship.

In the novelization of Star Trek: The Motion Picture written by Gene Roddenberry, he introduces the Vulcan term t'hy'la to describe Kirk and Spock's relationship, translating it as friend, brother or lover. Regarding this, a footnote was added where Kirk addresses the rumor that he and Spock were lovers:

I was never aware of this 'lovers' rumor, although I have been told that Spock encountered it several times. Apparently, he had always dismissed it with his characteristic lifting of his right eyebrow, which usually connoted some combination of surprise, disbelief, and/or annoyance. As for myself, although I have no moral or other objections to physical love in any of its many Earthly, alien, and mixed forms, I have always found my best gratification in that creature woman. Also, I would not like to be thought of as being so foolish that I would select a love partner who came into sexual heat only once every seven years.

In an interview, after revealing that he had cast Shatner as Kirk partly on the basis of his performance as Alexander, Roddenberry talked about fans seeing a possible parallel between Alexander and Hephaestion and Kirk/Spock:

Marshak and Culbreath: There's a great deal of writing in the Star Trek movement now which compares the relationship between Alexander and Hephaistion to the relationship between Kirk and Spock -- focusing on the closeness of the friendship, the feeling that they would die for one another --
Roddenberry: Yes, there's certainly some of that, certainly with love overtones. Deep love. The only difference being, the Greek ideal ... we never suggested in the series ... physical love between the two. But it's the ... we certainly had the feeling that the affection was sufficient for that, if that were the particular style of the 23rd century. (He looks thoughtful.) That's very interesting. I never thought of that before.

In a similar interview, Roddenberry states:

…I definitely designed it as a love relationship. And I hope that for men…who have been afraid of such relationships…that they [Spock and Kirk] would encourage them to be able to feel love and affection, true affection…love, friendship and deep respect. That was the relationship I tried to draw. I think I also tried to draw a feeling of belief that very few of us are complete unto ourselves. It’s quite a lovely thing…where two halves make a whole.

Another key scene which can be interpreted as homoerotic is in Star Trek II: The Wrath of Khan, when Spock dies, and tells Kirk, "I have been and always shall be your friend." In 1985, Roddenberry recalled from publication Killing Time, a novel that suggested the existence of such a relationship between Kirk and Spock. It has also been noted that although Kirk has had many female companions throughout the series, he always leaves them behind, citing his duties to the Enterprise, but he frequently risks the Enterprise and defies his stated duties in order to keep Spock safe. During the production of "Shore Leave", writer Theodore Sturgeon suggested, when criticising a scene with McCoy and two women, that "the whimsical friction between Bones and Spock" should be addressed in a future episode with a prostate massage. "Shore Leave" also contained a back massage scene where Kirk believes that he is being massaged by Spock.

The first known Kirk/Spock fan fiction story was "A Fragment Out of Time" by Diane Marchant, published in the fanzine Grup #3 (September 1974). It consisted of a sex scene but was written to not identify its participants nor make both of their sexes clear; Marchant stated in the next issue, however, that they were Kirk and Spock. Although many early Star Trek fans were fans of science fiction in general, as the show's popularity increased, it acquired fans who were not general science fiction fans but rather found the show appealed to them as a "buddy" show, or as a heroic/romantic saga, in which Kirk and Spock were the focus. This led to a quantity of fan fiction about the show focusing on the relationships between characters on the show, with less of an emphasis on science-fictional elements. Many of these fans found that Kirk and Spock's deep friendship was the most interesting topic for writing about Star Trek fan fiction.

Such "relationship" stories (K&S) were distinct from homoerotic ones (K/S), but both often removed Kirk and Spock from the Enterprise to avoid science fiction "distractions" like the starship and the Federation. In June 1976, the first Kirk/Spock dedicated fanzine appeared, but as the number of non-science fiction fans grew, within several years "relationship" stories became the dominant form of Star Trek fan fiction outside the K/S genre. By 1987, 30 K/S fanzines existed to 47 non-K/S.

Among Star Trek fans, the pairing was euphemistically referred to as "the premise", and mentioning it as such was a verbal shibboleth or "secret handshake" used to identify like-minded fans.

=== Other responses ===
Susan Sackett, Gene Roddenberry's personal assistant for 17 years, sometimes commented on the slash phenomenon. In September 1978, a fan mentioned a letter Sackett sent to a UK fan club president, commenting on the debate about the acceptability of including K/S fiction in zines: "Susan Sackett, assistant to Gene Roddenberry, stated in a letter to Janet dated February 27th - 'Gene and the executives at Paramount feel that this is harmful to the STAR TREK concept, since this was never the intention in creating the series."

Star Trek: The Original Series writer David Gerrold has also spoken about K/S slash sometimes. In 1985, Gerrold commented:

One of the truths I've been telling lately is that Kirk and Spock are not lovers ... they're not even boyfriends. They're just good friends. This has offended a whole subculture that is convinced they are ... I was at a convention in Milwaukee a few weeks ago. This lady comes up to me with this stuff, and after a thirty minute discussion, I finally said, 'Stop! We're arguing over whether or not two fictitious characters are getting their hands in each others' pants.'

== Slash subculture ==
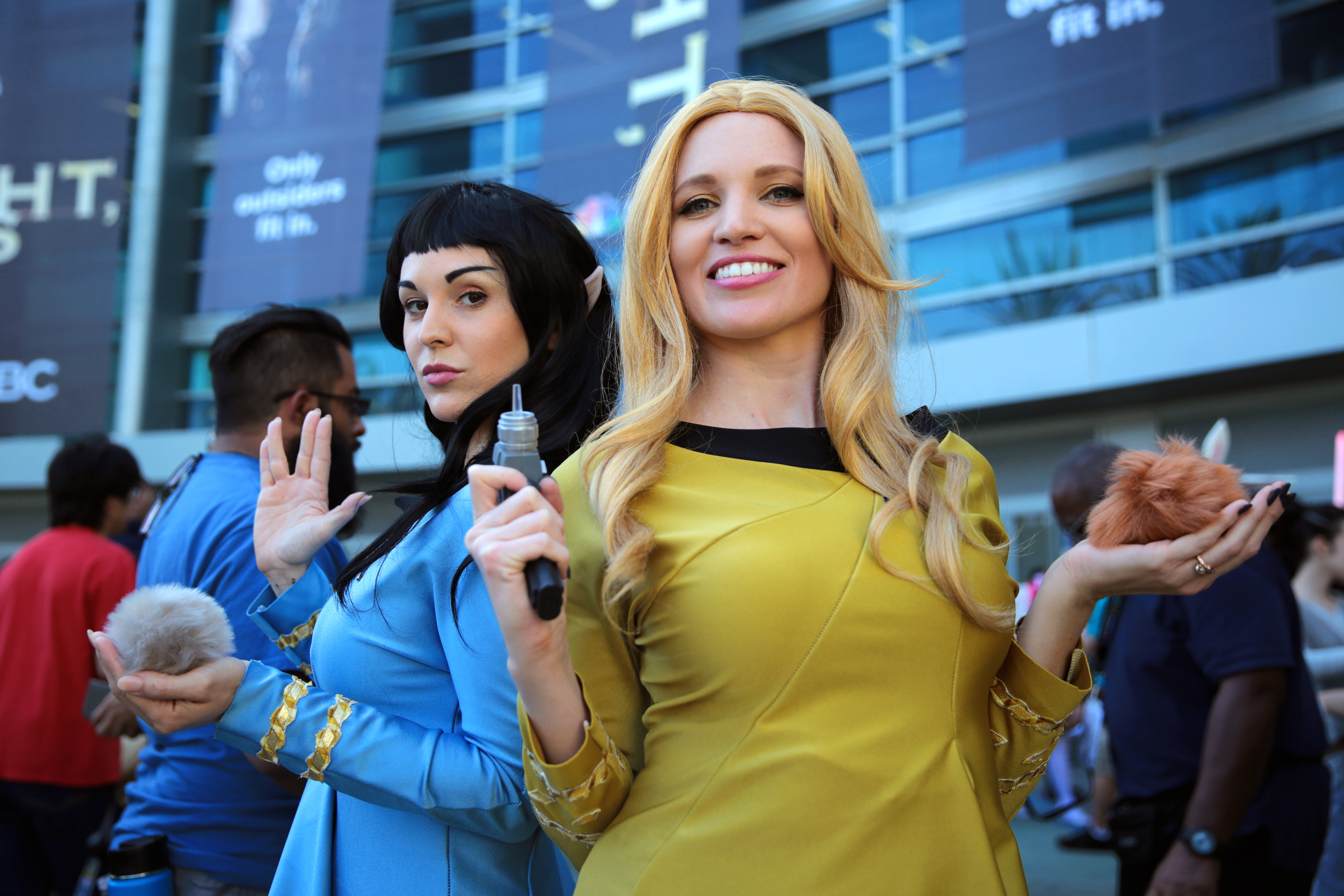
A female cosplay duo portraying Spock and Kirk

=== Academic interest ===
As one of the earliest "fandom" subcultures to emerge, Star Trek and K/S have attracted the attention of academics, particularly those of slash fiction. Henry Jenkins argued that "fandom" subculture, including fan writing, allows underrepresented groups to express their own interests and anxieties via a dominant cultural phenomenon. In this process, fan writings rewrite the original media by expanding on, emphasizing, and filtering the content to various extents. Jenkins claims that the way K/S reappropriates the Star Trek narrative and characters to the fan's own interpretation is thus done by all fan writings, not just K/S.

Many academics have suggested that K/S slash fiction is not about homosexuality or sex at all. Joanna Russ argued that the women who wrote K/S slash fiction were exploring a want for an idealized relationship where both partners were truly equal, unbound by gender norms. This kind of relationship was difficult to imagine in a heterosexual relationship, and thus K/S was born. Lamb and Veith similarly claimed that an equal relationship was challenging to write into a heterosexual model, and K/S united masculine and feminine traits of both characters to create an “androgynous” combination. Then K/S slash fiction is about transcending gendered norms and relationships. Falzone has suggested that K/S “queers” the original Star Trek narrative, which serves to liberate one from traditional beliefs and, specifically with regards to Star Trek, better imagine the prejudice-free utopia that was envisioned in Star Trek: The Original Series. It also enables fans to push back against corporate media's control of accepted narratives in the Star Trek universe.

On the other hand, some academics have argued for other reasons why K/S slash fiction is written. Camille Bacon-Smith speculates that K/S is a way for women to "openly discuss sexuality in a non-judgmental manner." Kirk and Spock's depiction in K/S zines has been described as "two equal individuals who complement each other", and a key theme has been that they can continue working and still be a couple, their relationship enhancing their ability to perform competently in their jobs. A fan has said of the pairing: "K/S has it all: friendship, relationship drama that gets resolved, enormous expressions of devotion through sacrifice, trust and commitment over a period of decades. It's really hard to find another fictional couple that did all that and did it as well." Bacon-Smith also speculated that as Kirk and Spock portray stereotypically feminine traits in K/S slash fiction, this allowed the predominantly female writers and readers of slash fiction to explore their own sexual fantasies. Constance Penley argued the women who write K/S slash fiction become “popular scientists” by taking figures from mass media (Kirk and Spock) to create their own productions from a marginalized position relative to patriarchal society and corporate media norms. Reasons why heterosexual women may write male homosexual slash fiction include: identifying oneself with the hero due to the original's focus on a hero rather than a heroine, giving men emotional responsibility by rewriting male characters, or to reorder typical sexual norms, through which the female writer could reconceive their own sexual role.

K/S could also serve as a kind of “Mary Sue” that implied the writers’ wish to include homosexuality where it had been neglected in the source material. Although there is no consensus on how homosexuality is depicted in Star Trek, Woledge suggests that as K/S stories draw on many particular events from the canon of Star Trek, the text itself is homoerotic.

Star Trek and K/S are also important to the study of vidding. In 1975, Kandy Fong presented a slideshow at the Equicon/Filmcon convention composed of Star Trek cut scenes, still images, audio snippets, and music. This presentation is often regarded as the first fan vid that began vidding subculture. With Gene Roddenberry's support, Fong produced several hours’ worth of shows, some of which were filmed and had cleaner audio added to them in an early example of vidding. Fong had been inspired to make these presentations based on promotional videos by the Beatles. Vidding has been used in K/S subculture by using clips from the episodes overlaid with other spoken or sung audio. Henry Jenkins has noted that particular scenes are singled out by vidders and used in multiple fanvids. An early example is Fong's “Both Sides Now” from 1980, which explores the contrast and ambiguity between Spock's inner and outer voices to suggest Spock may be bisexual.

=== Common plot devices ===
Placing Kirk and Spock in the Star Trek setting can be both beneficial and limiting for K/S authors. Setting the characters there provides familiarity for the audience and minimizes worldbuilding for the author. However, a potential difficulty is providing an explanation for why the story does not focus on the mission, in order to focus on the relationship between the two men.

Pon farr, a physiological response introduced in "Amok Time" that impelled Vulcans to "have sex or die", is a device used in some stories such as "The Ring of Soshern", a pre-1976 fan fiction where Kirk and Spock are marooned on an uncharted planet. However, other writers suggest that it is biologically impossible for a male to consummate pon farr with another male. Furthermore, in the Original Series, it is clearly stated that Vulcans are legally bound to their mate in childhood. They may neglect the relationship in future years but pon farr compels them to consummate the marriage at the appropriate time. Vulcans must mate or die trying. However, in "Amok Time", Spock engages in the kal-if-fee, a Vulcan ritual battle, and finds that a substitute to giving in to pon farr is to kill another, and thus Spock's pon farr imperative ends after he kills. Similar common plot elements include the plak tow ("blood fever") which precedes the onset of pon farr; the fact that Kirk, because of his empathic bond with Spock, can sense when Spock is about to go into pon farr, which even causes Kirk to suffer some of its symptoms himself; and "lingering death", the fate of a Vulcan male in pon farr who is unable to claim a mate.

Another key element in "first time" stories and in established relationship stories is the mind meld, either as a way to break the barriers between the men, or as a plot device. Shore leave is also a common setting as the plot can focus on the characters themselves rather than their responsibilities aboard a starship. “Hurt/comfort” is also a common trope, wherein one character is hurt in some manner and the other character tends to them. This trope tends to be paired with “first time” plots and often functions to make the characters realize their feelings towards each other.

=== Backlash ===
In general, fans have often been shamed and attacked by writers from both the media and academia. This would isolate those fans and their interpretations, often nonconforming to traditional perspectives, of their media of interest. In England, slash was an arrestable offence that violated obscenity laws. As a result, participants of K/S subculture were often outcast from the mainstream fan community. Female participants of slash fiction subculture were especially mocked due to gender stereotypes and discrimination. Fans of K/S were further rejected due to stigmas against homosexuality at the time.

== After the 2009 film reboot ==
In the 2009 feature film Star Trek, Spock and Nyota Uhura are depicted as a romantic couple. This resulted in some Kirk/Spock slash fans disliking Uhura, including Henry Jenkins who expressed the opinion that in the 2009 film, Uhura's character is largely there to be the "love object" in "some kind of still to be explored romantic triangle" between Kirk and Spock, and to explicitly "discourage" slashers. Margaret A. Weitekamp and Christine Scodari expressed the opinion that the portrayal of Uhura's character in the reboot is a step forward in terms of the representation of women of color.

On August 24, 2013, at the Fan Expo Canada, actor Zachary Quinto (who plays Spock in the rebooted Star Trek, and who is himself gay) replied to a fan asking him about whether his fictional character (and him and Chris Pine, the actor who plays James T. Kirk in the reboot) are lovers:

I mean no disrespect to people who either write or read fan fiction. I have absolutely no interest in it, it doesn't interest me, I understand how it interests other people, I respect their desire to be interested in it but I think both Kirk and Spock, and definitely me and Chris, are only good friends. Any suggestion otherwise has more to say about the person making that suggestion than it does about the character's lives.
