= Sexuality in Star Trek =

Sexuality has been a significant theme in the various Star Trek television and motion-picture series. Sexual relationships in Star Trek have mostly been depicted heteronormatively. There have been depictions of bisexual relationships, but always with a twist (e.g. using versions of characters from a mirror universe instead of the "real" ones; female Trills Dax and Kahn in "Rejoined" having been a heterosexual couple in their former lives). In Star Trek Discovery, there are two same-sex marriages, while Star Trek Enterprise included an alien polyamorous character, Phlox.

Inter-species and inter-ethnic relationships have been commonly depicted. A comparatively broader range of views has been shown concerning monogamy, polygamy, and the institution of marriage. In as much as sexuality can lead to reproduction, some plots have revolved around the possibility of children in a given inter-species relationship, as well as the prejudice that the resulting children have to endure from their parents' societies. The representations reflect contemporaneous attitudes to sexuality in American culture, first during the sixties and then in the later decades of the twentieth century.

== Interracial relationships in Star Trek ==
=== "Plato's Stepchildren" ===
The 1968 episode "Plato's Stepchildren" is often cited as the "first interracial kiss" depicted on television, between James T. Kirk (William Shatner) and Lt. Uhura (Nichelle Nichols), but the reality is not so straightforward. William Shatner recalls in Star Trek Memories that NBC insisted their lips never touch (the technique of turning their heads away from the camera was used to conceal this); moreover, the episode portrays the kiss as involuntary, being forced by telekinesis. Nichelle Nichols insists in her autobiography Beyond Uhura (written in 1994 after Shatner's book) that the kiss was real, even in takes where her head obscures their lips.

The term "interracial" is used in this context to refer to black and white actors. Star Trek had also featured an interracial kiss between William Shatner and France Nuyen in "Elaan of Troyius" but had drawn no comment. Nancy Sinatra and Sammy Davis Jr. kissed in the 1967 NBC TV special Movin' With Nancy (though on British television, the event had happened earlier in both a 1964 episode of the prime-time hospital soap Emergency – Ward 10 and in 1962 in a live televised drama, You in Your Small Corner).

Despite this, when NBC executives learned of the kiss they became concerned it would anger TV stations in the conservative Deep South. Earlier in 1968, NBC had expressed similar concern over a musical sequence in a Petula Clark special in which she touched Harry Belafonte's arm, a moment cited as the first occasion of direct physical contact on American television between a man and woman of different races. At one point during negotiations, the idea was brought up of having Spock kiss Uhura instead, but William Shatner insisted that they stick with the original script. NBC finally ordered that two versions of the scene be shot—one where Kirk and Uhura kissed and one where they did not. Having successfully shot the former version of the scene, Shatner and Nichelle Nichols deliberately flubbed every take of the latter version, thus forcing the episode to go out with the kiss intact. As Nichelle Nichols writes:

Knowing that Gene was determined to air the real kiss, Bill shook me and hissed menacingly in his best ham-fisted Kirkian staccato delivery, "I! WON'T! KISS! YOU! I! WON'T! KISS! YOU!"

It was absolutely awful, and we were hysterical and ecstatic. The director was beside himself, and still determined to get the kissless shot. So we did it again, and it seemed to be fine. "Cut! Print! That's a wrap!"

The next day they screened the dailies, and although I rarely attended them, I couldn't miss this one. Everyone watched as Kirk and Uhura kissed and kissed and kissed. And I'd like to set the record straight: Although Kirk and Uhura fought it, they did kiss in every single scene. When the non-kissing scene came on, everyone in the room cracked up. The last shot, which looked okay on the set, actually had Bill wildly crossing his eyes. It was so corny and just plain bad it was unusable. The only alternative was to cut out the scene altogether, but that was impossible to do without ruining the entire episode. Finally, the guys in charge relented: "To hell with it. Let's go with the kiss." I guess they figured we were going to be cancelled in a few months anyway. And so the kiss stayed.

There were few contemporary records of any complaints commenting on the scene. Nichelle Nichols observes that "Plato's Stepchildren" which first aired in November 1968 "received a huge response. We received one of the largest batches of fan mail ever, all of it positive, with many addressed to me from girls wondering how it felt to kiss Captain Kirk, and many to him from guys wondering the same thing about me. Almost no one found the kiss offensive" except from a single mildly negative letter by a white Southerner. Nichols notes that "for me, the most memorable episode of our last season was 'Plato's Stepchildren'."

== LGBT in Star Trek ==
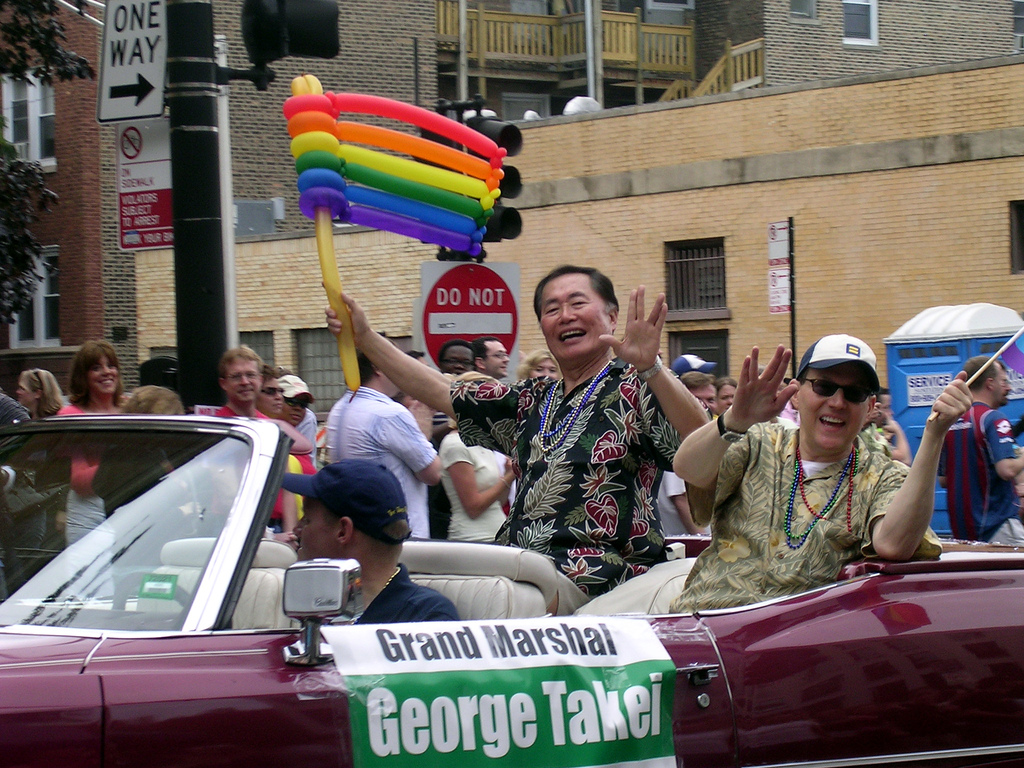
George Takei, who portrayed Lt. Sulu, at a pride parade in 2006. In 2005, Takei came out as gay.

Star Trek's original series did not have any explicitly LGBT characters, although in 2005 George Takei, who portrayed helmsman Lt. Hikaru Sulu, came out as gay. In October 2011, Zachary Quinto, who plays Spock in the rebooted feature film franchise, publicly came out as gay. He explained that, after the suicide of bisexual teenager Jamey Rodemeyer, he realized "that living a gay life without publicly acknowledging it is simply not enough to make any significant contribution to the immense work that lies ahead on the road to complete equality."

Roddenberry once spoke of overcoming his own homophobia. In a 1991 interview with The Humanist, he remarked:

My attitude toward homosexuality has changed. I came to the conclusion that I was wrong. I was never someone who hunted down 'fags' as we used to call them on the street. I would, sometimes, say something anti-homosexual off the top of my head because it was thought, in those days, to be funny. I never really deeply believed those comments, but I gave the impression of being thoughtless in these areas. I have, over many years, changed my attitude about gay men and women.

According to The Advocate, Roddenberry promised that in the then-upcoming fifth season of TNG, gay crew members would appear on the show. Other stars of the franchise chimed in, with Leonard Nimoy (who played Spock) offering his support in a 1991 letter to the Los Angeles Times saying, "It is entirely fitting that gays and lesbians will appear unobtrusively aboard the Enterprise—neither objects of pity nor melodramatic attention."

Roddenberry died soon after his interviews and the announced plans to have a gay crew member on TNG never materialized. Control of the Star Trek franchise fell to Rick Berman. While no gay crew members appeared on TNG, "The Outcast" was one episode that was intended to address the subject of sexual discrimination in the Star Trek universe. The episode was met with both praise and criticism from the LGBT community. In the case of the latter, criticism came from people who felt that it sanctioned the brainwashing therapy, and others who felt that the creative staff abdicated their responsibility to explore the issue.

In a 2008 interview, Trek writer Ronald D. Moore responded to a question of why there were few gay characters in science fiction in general and none on Star Trek:

We've just failed at it. It's not been something we've successfully done. At Star Trek we used to have all these stock answers for why we didn't do it. The truth is it was not really a priority for any of us on the staff so it wasn't really something that was strong on anybody's radar. And then I think there's a certain inertia that you're not used to writing those characters into these dramas and then you just don't. And somebody has to decide that it's important before you do it and I think we're still at the place where that's not yet a common – yeah, we have to include this and this is an important thing to include in the shows. Sci-fi for whatever reason is just sort of behind the curve on all this.

In 2002, Kate Mulgrew (who played Captain Janeway) gave an interview to Metrosource where she spoke candidly about the issue of LGBT characters in the Star Trek television universe:

Because of its both political and potentially incendiary substance. I'm in a minority as well, as a woman. It took a lot of courage on their part to hire a woman. I think that right up until the end they were very dubious about it. It's one thing to cast a subordinate black, Asian, or woman, but to put them in a leading role means the solid endorsement of one of the largest studios in the world. And that goes for a gay character as well. It requires a terrific social conscience on their part and the pledge of some solidarity and unanimity, which I think is probably at the source of most of this problem to get every one of those executives on board regarding this decision.

That same year Mulgrew stated in an August 2002 interview for Out in America:

Well, one would think that Hollywood would be more open-minded at this point, since essentially the whole town is run by the gay community. It makes very little sense if you think about it. No, Star Trek is very strangely by the book in this regard. Rick Berman, who is a very sagacious man, has been very firm about certain things. I've approached him many, many times over the years about getting a gay character on the show--one whom we could really love, not just a guest star. Y'know, we had blacks, Asians, we even had a handicapped character--and so I thought, this is now beginning to look a bit absurd. And he said, "In due time." And so, I'm suspecting that on Enterprise they will do something to this effect. I couldn't get it done on mine. And I am sorry for that.

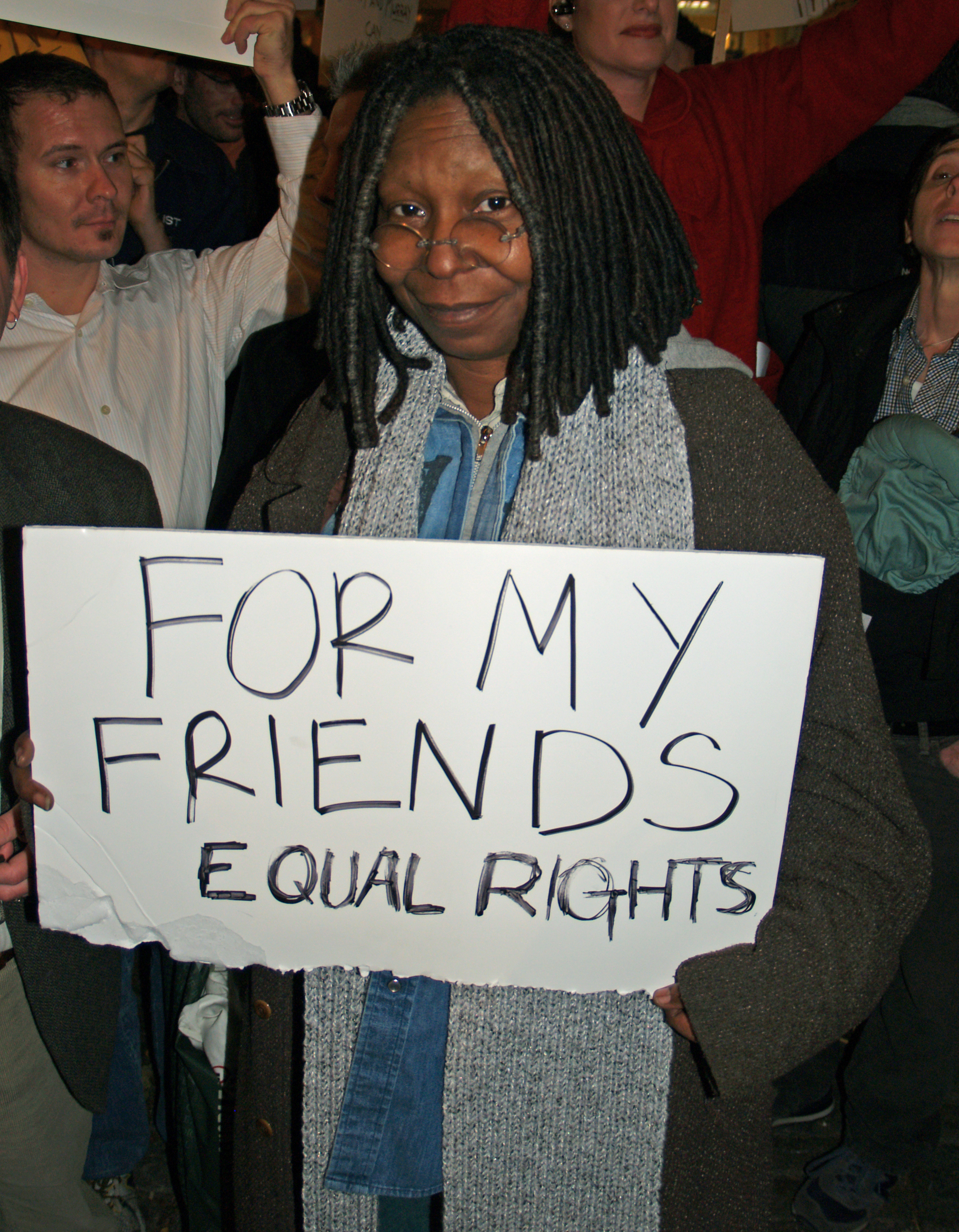
Whoopi Goldberg (Guinan) in 2008

In a 1990 Next Generation episode, "The Offspring", Data creates Lal, an android daughter, and the other crew members seek to explain humanoid sexuality to her. According to TNG research consultant Richard Arnold, Whoopi Goldberg refused to deliver her character's dialogue with a strictly heterosexual explanation:

According to the script, Guinan was supposed to start telling Lal, "When a man and a woman are in love..." and in the background, there would be men and women sitting at tables, holding hands. But Whoopi refused to say that. She said, "This show is beyond that. It should be 'When two people are in love.'"

Brannon Braga in 2011 spoke about the

...constant back and forth about "Well, how do we portray the spectrum of sexuality?" There were people who felt very strongly that we should be showing casually, you know, just two guys together in the background in Ten Forward. At the time the decision was made not to do that and I think those same people would make a different decision now because I think, you know, that was 1989, well yeah about 89, 90, 91. I have no doubt that those same creative players wouldn't feel so hesitant to have, you know, have been squeamish about a decision like that.

Suggesting that TNG in particular was under pressure from affiliates to be a "family show", Braga characterized the decision not to include LGBT characters as "not a forward thinking decision". Braga alluded to some episodes of TNG and one DS9 episode featuring Dax as dealing with non-heterosexuality metaphorically. Star Trek TNG did include a number of male members of the crew wearing mini-skirts (referred to as a skant), this was not further developed to explore whether this was a simple uniform choice or an expression of gender.

J. J. Abrams, who rebooted the franchise with 2009's Star Trek, said in 2011 that he was "frankly shocked that in the history of Star Trek there have never been gay characters in all the series". Including a gay character in the next film "was not in the list of my priorities to try to figure out how to make this movie in the best possible way. But it will now be in the hopper." Abrams did not commit to including an identifiably non-heterosexual character but did commit to bringing the idea to the writers. Ultimately, Star Trek Into Darkness did not include an identifiably LGBT character.

On July 7, 2016, it was announced that the film Star Trek Beyond would portray Hikaru Sulu as being in a same-sex relationship raising a daughter. This would make him the first openly gay main character in the Star Trek film franchise. Although George Takei was delighted that there was a gay character, he thought it was unfortunate that it was Sulu as it was not in keeping with what Gene Roddenberry would have wanted.

The 2017 series Star Trek: Discovery introduced Paul Stamets and Hugh Culber as the first openly gay characters in a Star Trek television series, as well as the first to be in a same-sex marriage. The show was criticized for killing-off Culber, and his death was seen as another example of the "bury your gays" trope. In Discovery's second season, recurring character Jett Reno mentioned that she was married, but her wife died in a war. The actors portraying all three roles—Anthony Rapp (Stamets), Wilson Cruz (Culber), and Tig Notaro (Reno)—are openly gay.

Discovery's third season introduced Adira Tal, a non-binary character who was in a relationship with Gray Tal, a transgender man and the former host of Adira's Trill symbiont, Tal. Gray was killed, leading to Adira hosting the symbiont and later being able to interact with Gray's consciousness. In the fourth season of Discovery, Gray's consciousness is put into an android body.

In the first-season finale of Star Trek: Picard, Seven of Nine and Raffi are seen holding hands, clasping fingers romantically. In the finale of the second season, Seven and Raffi kiss.

In the Star Trek: Strange New Worlds episode "Spock Amok", Christine Chapel is confirmed to have been in a relationship with a woman in the past. In the episode "The Serene Squall", the antagonist Captain Angel, played by transgender actress Jesse James Keitel, is non-binary; the episode was also directed by Navajo transgender filmmaker Sydney Freeland.

On October 8, 2020, the creator of Star Trek: Lower Decks, Mike McMahan confirmed that Captain Amina Ramsey was Beckett Mariner's former lover at Starfleet Academy, even though it wasn't explicit, saying that "every Starfleet officer is probably at the baseline bisexual" in a sense, and that they did not "intentionally mean for anybody to be strictly heteronormative or straight or cis." However, he promised to do better in the show's second season, saying they would dig into it more, saying that the show could, in the future, more explicitly state "things that the writers always knew about Mariner." In 2021 interview, McMahan said that Mariner and Sh'reyan, a woman shown in the season two finale, would be dating in the show's third season. He said that this fits with Mariner beginning to open up more as her character develops through the show.

=== Notable episodes ===
"Blood and Fire" (TNG)

"Blood and Fire" was commissioned to be written by David Gerrold but never actually filmed. Gerrold has stated that while many of the TNG cast and crew (including Roddenberry) were supportive of the storyline, the script's positive depiction of an openly gay couple met stiff opposition from the studio and the script never made it into production.

"The Outcast" (TNG)

In 1992, the episode titled "The Outcast" is a story in which Commander William Riker (Jonathan Frakes) falls in love with Soren, a member of the androgynous J'naii species that views the expression of gender, especially sexual liaisons, as a sexual perversion. When the affair between Riker and Soren is discovered, the J'naii force Soren to undergo "psychotectic" therapy. Soren gets the chance to defend one's right to love regardless of sex, gender or lack thereof. Soren was played by actress Melinda Culea, and all of the main J'naii characters were played by women, a creative decision criticized by Frakes, who commented that the episode was not daring enough in that Soren should have been more evidently male.

=== Other examples ===
- In the book A Stitch in Time actor Andrew Robinson stated that he played Garak as bisexual but other times he stated that he felt that Garak was pansexual, meaning that he loved people regardless of their gender. Star Trek: Lower Decks portrayed Garak and Bashir as a happily married couple in the episode "Fissure Quest".
- In Star Trek Enterprise, Dr Phlox is in a polyamourous relationship with multiple wives, as usual among his people.

=== Outside Star Trek canon ===
Instructions for authors that had previously wished to write officially licensed Star Trek spin-off books stated that there was to be no suggestion of a relationship "other than friendship" between crew members, but this restriction no longer applies.

In a seeming response to reams of Kirk/Spock fan fiction which began to dominate fan publications in the mid- to late 1970s, references to bisexuality occurred in Gene Roddenberry's 1979 novelization of Star Trek: The Motion Picture. In a foreword written by James Kirk, the Captain cleverly avoids confirmation or denial of a romantic relationship with Spock.

IDW Publishing, who publishes Star Trek comics, released a one-shot comic focused on the LGBT characters of Star Trek, Star Trek: Celebrations. It features stories of Seven of Nine and Raffi (Picard), Christine Chapel (Strange New Worlds), Hugh Culber, Paul Stamets, Adira Tal, and Gray Tal (Discovery), Mariner and Jennifer (Lower Decks), and Hikaru Sulu from the Kelvin timeline. Editor Heather Antos said "What is Star Trek, if not the idea of celebrating the best of us, right? The best of humanity, and coming together. There's a really great quote from Gene Roddenberry that that's the future he wants to see: a future where we are all not just tolerating one another, but celebrating one another. That is the intention behind Celebrations, and where we get the title from. It's wanting to celebrate the badasses of the Star Trek universe, whether that's Culber and Stamets, whether that's Mariner, whether that's Seven and Raffi... there's so many characters that we're going to get to see explored here by some incredible, incredible writers."

=== Fan response ===
In 1972, Grup, the first sexually themed Star Trek zine was published, to controversy in the fandom. In 1974 the first published Star Trek slash fiction was presented in Grup #3. Kirk/Spock fan fiction was the first prominent slash pairing.

In 2005 Craig Young of GayNZ.com criticized the absence of any out core or supporting lesbian or gay characters from the various television series and films, although granting that the series was more inclusive of transgender issues through the narrative use of the Trill species and non-consecutive gender symbiosis. He argued that the continued invisibility and absence of such characters may well have led to the growing rejection of the Trek franchise and spin-off media by gay and lesbian Trekkers. He compared it unfavorably to series like Doctor Who, Buffy the Vampire Slayer and Babylon 5.

The fan-made Star Trek: The Web Comic, started in 2014, has published two storylines featuring LGBT characters. The first serial, "No Good Deed", involves an affair between the male captain and first officer. Science Fiction news site Io9's review of the comic said it tread ground the franchise rarely did, stating: "What's especially refreshing is that [Captain Madison's] homosexuality is a part of his character, but not a focus of the plot."

== See also ==
- Pon farr
- Sex and sexuality in speculative fiction
- LGBT themes in speculative fiction
- Single-gender worlds
- List of LGBT-themed speculative fiction
- List of television shows with LGBT characters
