= Mindshadow =

Mindshadow may refer to:

- Mindshadow (novel), a 1986 novel
- Mindshadow (video game), a 1984 graphic adventure game
