= Ishmael (Hambly novel) =

1985 novel by Barbara Hambly

- Cover
- Author: Barbara Hambly
- Language: English
- Genre: Science fiction
- Publisher: Pocket Books
- Publication date: 1 May 1985
- Publication place: United States
- Media type: Print (Paperback)
- Pages: 256 pp
- ISBN: 0-671-55427-1 (first edition, paperback)
- OCLC: 12190798
- Preceded by: Shadow Lord
- Followed by: Killing Time

Ishmael is a novel by Barbara Hambly, set in the Star Trek fictional universe.

== Plot ==
Spock travels back to the time and place of Here Come the Brides, a 1968-70 ABC television series loosely based upon Asa Mercer's efforts to bring civilization to 1860s Seattle by importing the marriageable Mercer Girls from the war-ravaged East Coast of the United States. The show's premise was that eldest brother Jason Bolt bet his entire logging operation that he could persuade one hundred marriageable ladies to come to Seattle, and that all of them would be married or engaged within one year. Much of the dramatic and comic tension revolved around the efforts of their benefactor Aaron Stemple to thwart the deal and take control of the Bolts' holdings.

Spock discovers a Klingon plot to destroy the Federation by killing Aaron Stemple before Stemple could thwart an attempted 19th-century alien invasion of Earth. During most of the story, Spock has lost his memory and is cared for by Stemple, who passes him off as his nephew "Ishmael" and helps him hide his alien origins. Spock identifies one of the women in the story as likely to be one of his ancestors (on his mother's side).

== Spock's family name ==
The book ends with Kirk accessing the personnel record of his first officer, which reveals that Amanda Grayson's middle name is Stemple and that she was born in Seattle, Washington, thereby suggesting that Spock's mother is a descendant of Aaron Stemple; as a result of Spock being with Aaron Stemple, Stemple falls in love with Biddy the plainest of the girls. He asks her to marry him just before the Klingons arrive to try and kill Stemple. The same personnel record gives Spock's full name as S'chn T'gai Spock and his father as S'chn T'gai Sarek. Spock's family name has never been revealed on screen and only referred to as "unpronounceable" to humans (in the episodes "This Side of Paradise" and "Journey to Babel"). As with the forenames for Sulu and Uhura, first proposed in other Pocket Books Star Trek novels of this period (Hikaru and Nyota respectively) which were accepted as canon by Paramount in the 2009 feature film, Spock's full name became canon with the release of promotional materials for Star Trek: Strange New Worlds in 2022.

== Cameos, References, and Meta ==
Numerous other Western and science fiction characters make cameo appearances throughout the book. In San Francisco, Spock plays chess with a gunfighter dressed in black, which matches the description of Richard Boone's character Paladin in the TV series Have Gun Will Travel (pages 180-182). Star Trek creator Gene Roddenberry is credited for writing 24 episodes of this series.

The British TV series Doctor Who is referenced at least four times: the Fourth Doctor is described on page 13, Metebelis crystals from the serials The Green Death and Planet of the Spiders are mentioned on page 57, the Second Doctor is described on page 154, and Kirk recalls legends of a planet of stagnant time-travellers in the Kasteroborous galaxy on page 200.

Page 13 features Han Solo ("a scruffy-looking spice smuggler") from Star Wars, as well as Apollo and Starbuck from Battlestar Galactica ("a pair of brown-uniformed pilots from some down-at-the-heels migrant fleet"). Pages 153-154 feature Little Joe Cartwright and his brother Hoss Cartwright from Bonanza ("a good-looking boy in the dusty clothes of a trailhand just in from Virginia City, and his oxlike older brother") and Bret or Bart Maverick from Maverick. Emperor Norton and his dogs also appear. Matt Dillon (Gunsmoke), Lucas McCain (The Rifleman), The Rawhide Kid (Rawhide), and the Man With No Name also make appearances.

Several actors from Here Come the Brides had also appeared on Star Trek. Mark Lenard played Aaron Stemple, whom the novel implies was Spock's ancestor. Lenard also played the role of Sarek, Spock's father, in the original Star Trek TV series and in Star Trek: The Next Generation, as well as a Romulan commander in the episode "Balance of Terror" (the first time the Romulans are seen in the series) and the Klingon Commander in Star Trek: The Motion Picture, the first "new" Klingon to be seen, and the first Klingon to be heard speaking their language. The actor playing Jason Bolt (the eldest brother) was Robert Brown who played "Lazarus" in the Star Trek episode "The Alternative Factor." The actor playing Joshua Bolt (a younger brother) was David Soul who played "Makora" in the Star Trek episode "The Apple."

Another reference is Florinda's Place, referenced on page 181. Florinda Grove, a character in Gwen Bristow's novel Jubilee Trail was an adventuress in Los Angeles who, when she first heard that gold had been discovered, headed to San Francisco to open a gambling palace. When asked by her friends how they could find her, she said "Ask anyone for the best place in town." When asked, "Why will it be the best?" she calmly replied, "Because I'll be running it."
