= Shadow Lord (novel) =

1985 novel by Laurence Yep

- Cover of the first edition
- Author: Laurence Yep
- Cover artist: Boris Vallejo
- Language: English
- Genre: Science fiction
- Publisher: Pocket Books
- Publication date: 1 March 1985
- Publication place: United States
- Media type: Print (Paperback)
- Pages: 280 pp
- ISBN: 0-671-47392-1
- OCLC: 11766520
- Preceded by: Uhura's Song
- Followed by: Ishmael

Shadow Lord is a Star Trek: The Original Series novel written by Laurence Yep.

== Plot ==
Prince Vikram of the planet Angira has spent some time studying on Earth. He plans to return home with new ways of changing his homeland. Accompanying him are Spock and Hikaru Sulu. Resistance comes from Angirans who hate new technology. The two Starfleet officers are swept up in the fighting and must use primitive weapons themselves to survive.
