= Killing Time (Van Hise novel) =

1985 book by Della Van Hise

- Cover
- Author: Della Van Hise
- Language: English
- Genre: Science fiction
- Publisher: Pocket Books
- Publication date: July 1985
- Publication place: United States
- Media type: Print (Paperback)
- Pages: 311
- ISBN: 0-671-52488-7 (first edition, paperback)
- OCLC: 12268057
- Preceded by: Ishmael
- Followed by: Dwellers in the Crucible

Killing Time is a science fiction novel by American writer Della Van Hise. Part of the Star Trek: The Original Series franchise, it was published by Pocket Books in 1985. The original manuscript had Kirk/Spock slash fiction elements, and these were requested to be removed by Paramount. However, they were not removed, and 250,000 copies were printed. These romantic undertones between Spock and James T. Kirk were brought to the attention of the office of the creator of Star Trek, Gene Roddenberry, who made Pocket Books recall the first edition. This edition subsequently became a collector's item, with more than fifty changes made to a revised version.

== Plot ==
The USS Enterprise is on patrol near the Romulan neutral zone and the crew is experiencing unusual dreams. Captain James T. Kirk and Science Officer Spock both confess that they are having dreams that Spock is captain of the ship and Kirk is an ensign. Kirk informs Spock that Starfleet intelligence has discovered that the Romulans are attempting to use time travel and are sending more ships to investigate. Captain Kirk goes to sleep, and awakes as Ensign Kirk on the VSS ShiKahr, which appears to otherwise be the Enterprise. The ensign is a drug-addled ex-convict who has been on board for only a day.

The Romulans had attempted to travel back in time and destroy the Federation, but they instead created a Federation dominated by Vulcans. They shielded a ship from the changes and compare the differences, realising that it needs to be reversed. Meanwhile, Captain Spock begins to act protectively of Ensign Kirk, but the Captain is injured on an away mission. After Doctor McCoy conducts a series of mental scans, the crew of the ShiKahr realise that history has been altered. The Romulans plot to use Kirk to force Spock to impersonate their leader. Spock mindmelds with Kirk, each realising their personas from the main timeline.

Romulan agents board the ShiKahr and capture Kirk. Spock agrees to their demands and travels with them. Whilst en route, Spock enters pon farr and finds that he is linked to Kirk, but mates with the Romulan Thea to allow it to pass. They retrieve Kirk, and discover that taking Kirk and Spock was a ploy to have them both travel back in time to stop the Romulan agents from preventing the formation of the Federation. They travel back in time and disable the agents, but Spock is seriously injured and dying. Kirk and Spock mindmeld as reality shifts once more and restores the original timeline.

== Development ==
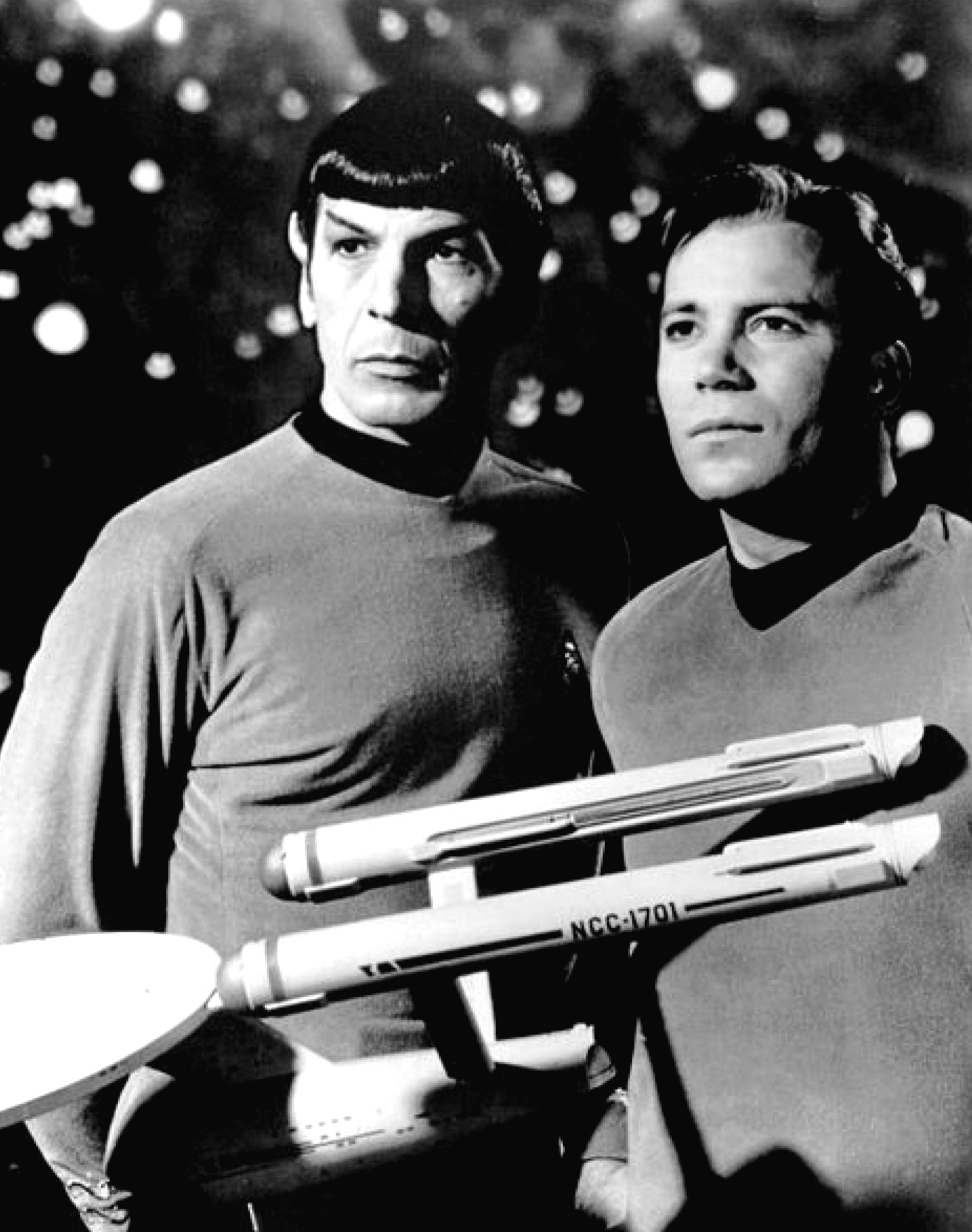
The original manuscript included Kirk/Spock slash fiction overtones

The original manuscript of Killing Time included Kirk/Spock based slash fiction overtones. The foundation of this genre of writing dated back to the 1970s with fan created fiction about Kirk and Spock. This has since become a term typically used for same-sex unofficial fiction. Author Della van Hise had previously written these types of stories about those characters. When that manuscript was sent by Pocket Books for approval by Paramount Studios, the pages with the slash fiction were marked to be edited out of the eventual novel. It was returned, but at the time Pocket Books were between editors as Mimi Panich had just left, and her replacement Karen Haas had not yet arrived. At some point, someone went through the manuscript and marked the pages which Paramount had asked to be removed with the letters "STET", which is a Latin term used by proofreaders to tell the printer to disregard earlier changes.

Pocket Books published 250,000 copies of Killing Time in the first print run. After the publishing, Gene Roddenberry's assistant, Richard Arnold, received a letter from a reader stating that the book was suggesting a romantic link between Kirk and Spock. This was passed to Roddenberry, the creator of Star Trek, who reportedly "became livid". Following his complaints to Pocket Books, the first print run of the novel was recalled and destroyed. Pocket Books had already shipped between 100,000 and 150,000 copies of the book to retailers. When the news broke, fans began purchasing the novels before they could be removed from the shelves as the first edition was expected to become a collector's item. Van Hise later said of that version of the novel, "If someone went looking for 'questionable material', in Killing Time, they could find it... Just as beauty is in supposedly in the mind of the beholder, so is questionable material." More than fifty changes were made to the novel before it was republished as a second edition.

Following the issues with the publishing of Killing Time, there was increased oversight by Roddenberry's staff regarding the novels published by Pocket Books. This was delegated to Arnold, and would later cause confusion for Pocket Books as comments would be sent back and it was sometimes unclear whether they were from Roddenberry or Arnold. These comments rejected plot developments in the novels where they were stepping out of the bounds set by the television series. Rumours subsequently spread that there was an alternative version of the manuscript with more explicit Kirk/Spock slash details, something that Van Hise later denied.

== Critical reception ==
Ellen Cheeseman-Meyer, writing for Tor.com in February 2013, said that Killing Time was "incredibly romantic". She stated that it reminded her of 18th century literary Romanticism, "which suggested that morality lay in nature and civilization was a corrupting influence". She said that whilst it could be considered "a trivial piece of fluff tossed off by a fan writer and published when Pocket Books wasn’t paying much attention", it could also be seen to be a "call to action that requires readers to examine their relationships and their actions". In Elizabeth Woledge's article for Extrapolation, entitled "From Slash to the Mainstream: Female Writers and Gender Blending Men", she describes Killing Time as "erotic but not sexual" and said that Spock and Kirk both "combine masculine and feminine imagery". She suggested that it was not the romantic overtones that caused the reaction, but rather that it was this gender-blending that was the issue.

== See also ==
- Kirk/Spock
