= Brad Ferguson =

American science fiction writer (born 1953)

Bradley Michael Ferguson
- Born: 11 January 1953 (age 73)
- Occupations: Author; radio writer; editor; producer
- Writing career
- Pen name: Brad Ferguson
- Genre: Science fiction

Bradley Michael Ferguson (born 1953) is a journalist and science fiction writer. He writes as Brad Ferguson.

== Life ==
Ferguson is married to scientist Kathi Ferguson, with whom he collaborated on one novel.

== Literary works ==
Ferguson has worked as a writer, editor and producer for CBS Radio News in New York. He is the author of a number of Star Trek tie-in novels, several short stories, and the post-holocaust novel The World Next Door. He served a three-year term as eastern regional director of the Science Fiction and Fantasy Writers of America (SFWA), starting in 1999.

== Bibliography ==
=== Novels ===
==== Star Trek tie-ins ====
- Crisis on Centaurus (1986)
- A Flag Full of Stars (1991)
- Star Trek, the Next Generation: The Last Stand (1995)
- Star Trek: Starfleet Academy 13. The Haunted Starship (with Kathi Ferguson) (1997)

==== Other novels ====
- The World Next Door (1990)

=== Short stories ===
- "Last Rights" (Analog, Nov. 1988)
- "Rhuum Service" (Hotel Andromeda, edited by Jack L. Chalker, 1994)
- "To Tell the Troof" (Fantasy & Science Fiction, Jan. 1989)
- "The World Next Door" (Isaac Asimov's Science Fiction Magazine, Sep. 1987)
