= Margaret Wander Bonanno =

American writer (1950–2021)

- Born: February 7, 1950; New York City, U.S.
- Died: April 6, 2021 (aged 71); Los Angeles, California, U.S.
- Occupation: Writer
- Children: 2
- Writing career
- Pen name: Rick North
- Years active: 1979–2018
- Genres: Science fiction, general fiction
- Subject: Biography
- Notable works: Dwellers in the Crucible; Strangers from the Sky; The Others series Preternatural series

Margaret Wander Bonanno (February 7, 1950 – April 6, 2021) was an American science fiction writer, ghost writer, and small press publisher. She wrote seven Star Trek novels, science fiction novels (including The Others series and the Preternatural series), a collaborative novel with Nichelle Nichols, a biography, and other works.

== Biography ==
Bonanno was born in Brooklyn, New York. Her first novel, the feminist A Certain Slant of Light, was published by Seaview Books in 1979.

After two well-received Star Trek novels, Dwellers in the Crucible (1985) and Strangers from the Sky (1985), Bonanno's next novel, ultimately titled Probe, was the victim of changes in the franchise. With the debut of Star Trek: The Next Generation (1987), Paramount took a closer role in supervising the books, disallowing story elements that were said to conflict with Gene Roddenberry's idea of Star Trek. Instead of being rejected, Probe was heavily edited and ultimately mostly written by Gene DeWeese. Bonanno said that Probe contained only "seven percent" of her original material.

Bonanno's public disavowal of the book included her sharing her original manuscript Music of the Spheres at Star Trek conventions. This led to Bonanno being blacklisted from the Star Trek publishing universe for over 11 years; in 2003 she returned with Catalyst of Sorrows, part of the Star Trek: The Lost Era series.

Bonanno was a member of TrekNation and posted regularly on the Trek BBS.

Her novel Preternatural was a 1997 New York Times Notable Book. Preternatural^{3}, a sequel, was a 2002 New York Times Notable Book.

Bonanno, who had lived in the Los Angeles area, died on April 6, 2021, aged 71.

== Bibliography ==
=== Star Trek novels ===
- Dwellers in the Crucible (Pocket Books, 1985) ISBN 0-671-60373-6
- Strangers from the Sky (Pocket Books, 1987) ISBN 978-0-671-64049-1
- Music of the Spheres (1990) — Bonanno's unapproved version of Probe, never officially published
- Probe (Pocket Books, 1992) ISBN 978-0671724207 — mostly written by Gene DeWeese; contains only seven percent of Music of the Spheres
- Catalyst of Sorrows (Star Trek, 2003) ISBN 978-0743464079 — Part of the Star Trek: The Lost Era series.
- Burning Dreams (Gallery Books, 2006) ISBN 978-1451613445 — Featuring Christopher Pike.
- Its Hour Come Round (Pocket Books/Star Trek, 2007). ISBN 978-1416594949 — An e-book novella, sixth book in the Mere Anarchy series.
- Unspoken Truth (Pocket Books/Star Trek, 2010) ISBN 978-1439102190 — Dealt with Saavik's origins as a feral child

=== Other science fiction ===
- Saturn's Child (Putnam Adult, 1996) with Nichelle Nichols ISBN 978-0399141133
- Ailuranth (Bowker, 2018) ISBN 978-0983777335

==== Others series ====
1. The Others (St. Martin's Press, 1990) ISBN 978-0312051402
2. OtherWhere (St. Martin's Press, 1991) ISBN 978-0312064334
3. OtherWise (St. Martin's Press, 1993) ISBN 978-0312093587

==== Preternatural series ====
1. Preternatural (Tor Books, 1997) ISBN 978-0312862091
2. Preternatural Too: Gyre (Tor Books, 2001) ISBN 978-0312866716
3. Preternatural^{3} (Tor Books, 2002) ISBN 9780312862091

=== Mainstream fiction ===
- A Certain Slant of Light (Seaview Books, 1979) ISBN 978-0872235328
- Ember Days (Seaview Books, 1980) ISBN 978-0872235908
- Callbacks (Seaview Books, 1981) ISBN 978-0872237186
- Risks (St. Martin's Press, 1989) ISBN 978-0312034214
- Ain't Exactly Clear (Van Wander Press, 2016) ISBN 978-0978566876

=== Children's books ===
- Destination Mars (Zebra Books, 1991) as by Rick North (part of the Young Astronauts series) ISBN 978-0821732854
- Citizens of Mars (Zebra Books, 1991) as by Rick North (part of the Young Astronauts series) ISBN 978-0821733080

=== Nonfiction ===
- Angela Lansbury: A Biography (St. Martin's Press, 1987) ISBN 978-0312005610
