= Cause and Effect (Star Trek: The Next Generation) =

- Star Trek: The Next Generation episode
- Episode no.: Season 5 Episode 18
- Directed by: Jonathan Frakes
- Written by: Brannon Braga
- Production code: 218
- Original air date: March 23, 1992

Guest appearances
- Kelsey Grammer – Morgan Bateson; Michelle Forbes – Ro Laren; Patti Yasutake – Alyssa Ogawa

Episode chronology
← Previous "The Outcast"	Next → "The First Duty"
- Star Trek: The Next Generation season 5

"Cause and Effect" is the 18th episode of the fifth season of the American science fiction television series Star Trek: The Next Generation, the 118th overall. It was originally released on March 23, 1992, in broadcast syndication. It was written by Brannon Braga, who sought to write an unusual type of time travel-related plot, and directed by cast member Jonathan Frakes.

Set in the 24th century, the series follows the adventures of the Starfleet crew of the Federation starship Enterprise-D. In this episode, the Enterprise is caught in a time loop which results in the destruction of the ship and the loss of all hands after a collision with the USS Bozeman. As events continue to repeat themselves, the crew feels a sense of déjà vu and, upon investigation, realize their predicament. Lt. Commander Data (Brent Spiner) learns how to pass a brief message to himself in the next loop, which allows him to save the ship from destruction.

Cheers actor Kelsey Grammer was offered the role of Captain Morgan Bateson and accepted. Due to scheduling conflicts, Kirstie Alley was unable to reprise her Star Trek II: The Wrath of Khan role as Lt. Saavik. Plans for the USS Bozeman were changed due to the budget, which resulted in a modification to the USS Reliant model created for The Wrath of Khan and the use of the movie-era Enterprise bridge.

"Cause and Effect" received Nielsen ratings of 13.0 percent, making it the sixth most watched episode of the season. Critics praised the episode, specifically Braga's writing, Frakes's direction, and the opening sequence in which the Enterprise is destroyed.

== Plot ==
The Enterprise is caught in a time loop (referred to in-universe as a "temporal causality loop"). It begins with the senior officers playing poker and continues for about a day until they encounter a spatial anomaly. While studying the anomaly, a Federation ship emerges from it, on a collision course with the Enterprise. Commander Riker suggests decompressing the main shuttlebay to move Enterprise out of danger, while Lt. Commander Data advocates using a tractor beam to push the other ship away. Captain Picard chooses Data's option; the maneuver is unsuccessful, and the other ship strikes one of Enterprise's warp nacelles, causing a critical failure and the destruction of the Enterprise moments later, at which point the loop restarts.

Initially, crew members are unaware of the loop. However, Dr. Crusher begins to hear voices as she goes to bed following the poker game. In a subsequent loop, the senior officers experience déjà vu and realize they can accurately predict the cards Data will deal during the poker game. Crusher uses a tricorder to record the voices and discovers they are the panicked commands and broadcasts of the crew. The senior staff work out that they are stuck in the loop; the voices they are hearing are their own from previous loops, just prior to the destruction of the ship. They determine that the loop resets after the two ships collide but are unsure how to avert this outcome. Data suggests using his positronic brain to send a short message to himself in the next loop, which may help them avoid the collision. When they arrive at the anomaly and collide with the other ship, Data sends the message.

On the following loop, Crusher again has a feeling of déjà vu during the poker game, but when Data deals the next hand, all the cards are threes, followed by multiple sets of three of a kind. The number 3 begins appearing throughout the ship as the crew again determine they are stuck in a time loop. When they reach the anomaly and the ship appears, Data realizes that 3 stands for the number of command pips on Riker's uniform and quickly executes Riker's suggestion rather than his own. The tactic succeeds and allows Enterprise to safely clear the oncoming ship, ending the time loop. The crew establish they have been trapped in the loop for 17 days, while the other ship, the USS Bozeman, has been missing for over 90 years. Upon making contact with the Bozeman's captain Morgan Bateson, Picard invites him to beam aboard, saying they have much to discuss.

== Production ==
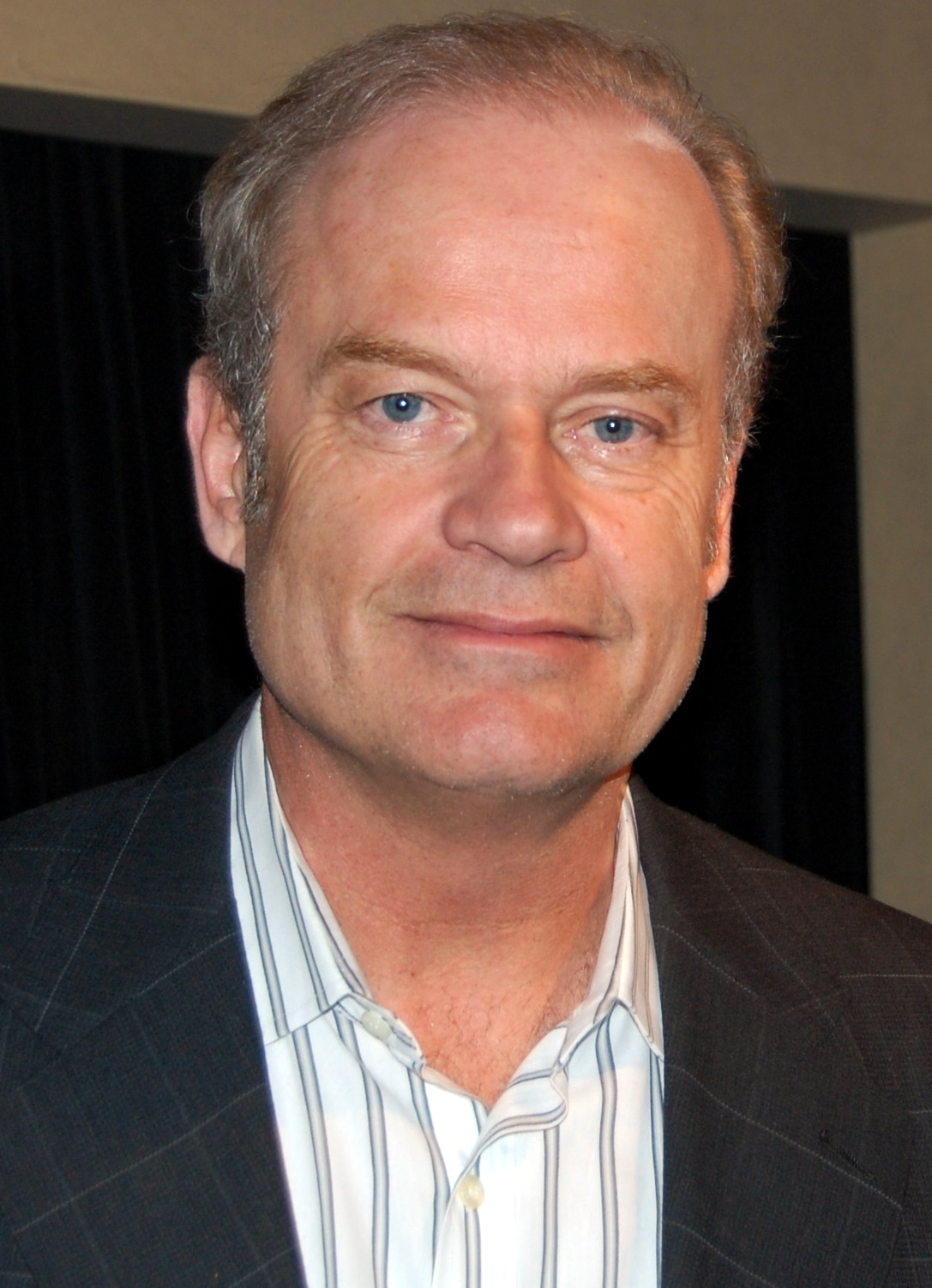
Kelsey Grammer was offered the role of Captain Morgan Bateson in "Cause and Effect", and was not required to audition.

The script was written by Brannon Braga, who sought to write a time-travel related episode without using a "screwed up time-lines" type plot. Braga called it the most enjoyable episode he wrote that season, as he had never seen a time loop episode before but he did not know how to get the crew out of the loop, nor what the message was which would be passed to a future loop. He attributed the poker game, which was not in the original plan, to a sugar rush after eating pancakes. He felt that the destruction of the Enterprise was the best possible cold open for the episode, and he was pleased with how he managed to tie the poker game into the overall plot. Braga named the USS Bozeman for his hometown of Bozeman, Montana, while the registration number of NCC-1941 was a reference to the Stephen Spielberg film 1941 (1979) on which visual effects artist Greg Jein had also worked.

Braga recalled that the actors had the same confused reaction as the audience would when they initially read the script. Many of them wondered if it was a joke. The idea had evolved from his desire to do an episode telling the same story from different perspectives, like the classic Akira Kurosawa film Rashomon. Braga changed his plan to the time loop when he could not find a way to make his original concept fit into an hour-long episode. Braga's greatest difficulties were how the episode would resolve, for which he turned to his fellow writers, and the scene in the briefing room where LaForge explains how the Enterprise has become trapped in a time loop. "It was my first big 'technobabble' scene, so it couldn't just sound cool. It had to sound plausible. It had to resolve all the clues that had been accumulating", he recalled. To make it distinctly his, he added some shocking lines, such as LaForge telling Picard that the ship might have been trapped in the loop for years. Showrunner Michael Piller had Braga rewrite that scene many times. "I remember over Christmas break of that year, I was working on [it]."

Cast member Jonathan Frakes directed the episode, having prepared for it while shooting the episode "The Outcast". He was not involved in the casting process, as they had offered the role of Captain Morgan Bateson to Kelsey Grammer, who had accepted. Grammer was a Star Trek fan, and in his role as Frasier Crane on Cheers, he filmed on the Paramount lot near where The Next Generation was produced. Frakes found it a challenge to film the same scenes with the same dialogue over and over but in a way which made them look different. Marvin V. Rush, the director of photography, worked with cameraman Waverly Smothers to develop an attachment for a camera using a bungee cord, which allowed for a different style of shooting. Frakes also worked while at home, planning out shots in order to ensure that there was a variety to each loop. Executive producer Rick Berman had made it clear that Frakes could not re-use footage and each loop needed to be filmed fresh, in order to prevent the episode from looking like a clip show. To do so, Frakes used angles on familiar sets that had never been used, such as shooting the conference room from the ceiling and the bridge from where Riker and Ensign Ro sat. He also used Steven Spielberg's technique of using a slow zoom to indicate a character understanding their situation.

Several changes took place to the script because of filming and casting difficulties. The crew planned to make the USS Bozeman a Star Trek: The Original Series-era Constitution class ship, similar to the original USS Enterprise. However, no model was available to use and the costs of creating a new one, along with costumes and props, were prohibitive enough that the plan was scrapped. Instead, the USS Reliant model created for Star Trek II: The Wrath of Khan was used. Greg Jein and Michael Okuda made the relevant changes, removing the rollbar and adding sensor arrays, resulting in it being described as a Soyuz class vessel. The bridge of the Bozeman was a re-dressed version of the film series Enterprise bridge. The producers had hoped to get Kirstie Alley, then a co-star of Grammer's on the sitcom Cheers, in a cameo role behind Grammer in the USS Bozeman shots, reprising her role as Lieutenant Saavik from the movie The Wrath of Khan, but could not do so due to scheduling difficulties. Rob Legato organized the large-scale miniature effects for the episode on set 10, with large-scale but low-detail versions of the Enterprise created along with just nacelle models for the Bozeman to collide with.

Originally, the episode was to end with a montage of all the crashes between the two ships, but that scene was cut for budgetary reasons.

== Reception ==
The episode aired during the week commencing March 23, 1992, in broadcast syndication. According to Nielsen Media Research, it received ratings of 13.0 percent. This means that it was watched by 13 percent of all households watching television during its timeslot. It was the sixth most watched episode of the season, behind both parts of "Unification", "A Matter of Time", "Power Play" and "The Game". Some viewers complained to the stations broadcasting it, believing that the repeating acts were the result of a technical problem.

James Van Hise, in his book The Unauthorized Trek: The Complete Next Generation, said that the episode "fascinated" him due to its "experimental" nature. He praised the direction of Frakes, who saved it from being a series of "potentially boring repetition[s]", adding that he "clearly has a firm grasp on the series." Juliette Harrisson listed "Cause and Effect" as the seventh most groundbreaking episode of the series in 2012 for Den of Geek. Keith DeCandido gave the episode a rating of nine out of ten in a review for Tor, praising the means by which Frakes made each repetition different, and Braga's writing, which he described as a "tour de force". He said that "Cause and Effect" had "the best teaser in the history of Star Trek", adding: "This is an absolute triumph of craft from both Braga and Frakes, and just a fun episode, with the added bonus of Captain Frasier Crane at the end. I almost didn't need to rewatch this one, as it's one of my go-to episodes when I want to watch a Star Trek episode for the heck of it, and I have yet to tire of it."

Zack Handlen gave "Cause and Effect" a grade of "A" in his review for The A.V. Club. He called the opening sequence "strong", and said that one of the "tricks" of this episode was that it does not break its own rules in finding a resolution. He summarized, "Once again, TNG does what it does best: You take an ostensibly goofy idea, and then you make it sting by thinking through the consequences." In a list of the top 100 episodes of the Star Trek franchise, "Cause and Effect" was placed in 62nd place by Charlie Jane Anders at io9.

In 2016, The Hollywood Reporter said this was the 70th best episode of all Star Trek television, and possibly the best opening scene.

Viviane Casimir published an article in the winter 1997 issue of the journal Extrapolation that used Data's ability to transmit a message to himself as an example of assigning special mental abilities to a cyborg. In Computers of Star Trek, Lois Gresh and Robert Weinberg noted a contradiction between the description of Data being built around a neural net and examples of traditional von Neumann architecture. They noted how, in "Cause and Effect", when a crew member removed the cover to Data's positronic brain, it exposed flashing lights reminiscent of the large computers of the fifties and sixties, that reflected the values in the CPU's accumulator and other registers.

In 2017, Den of Geek listed "Cause and Effect" as one of the top ten ground-breaking episodes of Star Trek: The Next Generation.

In 2018, CBR ranked this one of the top twenty time travel themed episodes of all Star Trek series. The episode inspired the 2018 Legends of Tomorrow episode "Here I Go Again".

In 2019, ThoughtCo ranked "Cause and Effect" in the top ten best episodes of the series, describing it as a "great story of time and choices". Also in 2019, The Hollywood Reporter ranked it among the top 25 episodes of Star Trek: The Next Generation, describing it as having a unique repetitive structure and noting its direction by Jonathan Frakes. The Hollywood Reporter ranked "Cause and Effect" as the 19th best episode of Star Trek: The Next Generation, noting the time-loop plot.

In 2019, The Hollywood Reporter listed this among the 25 best episodes of Star Trek: The Next Generation.

In 2020, Screen Rant ranked this episode the 13th best of Star Trek: The Next Generation, noting a "lot of tension in the episode" and that the Kelsey Grammer cameo was a "treat". That same year, they conclude that it is "One of the best TNG episodes ever written," however, they also call it a terrifying episode and one of the top most frightening episodes of the series. They found the destruction of the Enterprise at the start "shocking", and then the audience is taken on a repeating "roller coaster ride" of déjà vu catastrophe.

== Media releases ==
"Cause and Effect" was first released on VHS cassette in the United States and Canada on June 10, 1997. The episode was later released in the United States on November 5, 2002, as part of the season five DVD box set. A further DVD release came as part of The Best of Star Trek: The Next Generation – Volume 2 on November 17, 2009, in the United States.

The first Blu-ray release was in the United States on November 18, 2013, followed by the United Kingdom on November 19.

== Influence ==
Beau DeMayo, creator of X-Men '97, cited "Cause and Effect" as an influential hint towards the first season's final episode "Tolerance Is Extinction Part 3."
