= Uhura's Song =

1985 novel by Janet Kagan

- Cover of the first edition
- Author: Janet Kagan
- Language: English
- Genre: Science fiction
- Publisher: Pocket Books
- Publication date: January 1985
- Publication place: United States
- Media type: Print (paperback)
- Pages: 373
- ISBN: 0-671-65227-3 (first edition, paperback)
- OCLC: 144989687
- Preceded by: The Vulcan Academy Murders
- Followed by: Shadow Lord

Uhura's Song is a Star Trek: The Original Series novel written by Janet Kagan published in 1985. Kagan was asked to produce an outline by editor David G. Hartwell, after he read the manuscript of her novel Hellspark. She was unfamiliar with Star Trek and needed to research the series whilst writing Uhura's Song. She subsequently proposed two sequels, but they went unwritten as they featured original characters introduced in Uhura's Song.

== Plot ==
Lt. Uhura's friendship with a cat-like diplomat from Eeiauo becomes vital when a plague threatens the population. The songs they shared are key to the cure. When the plague begins to infect humans starting with Dr. McCoy, the crew of the Enterprise must work to decipher the songs and cure the plague.

== Development ==
Janet Kagan was first introduced to Star Trek: The Original Series by her younger brother during the original run of the show. She was invited to submit a proposal for a Star Trek novel by David G. Hartwell, to whom she had submitted her novel Hellspark in his capacity as editor of Timescape, Pocket Books' science fiction and fantasy novels line. Hartwell liked the novel, but Timescape did not accept novels from previously-unpublished authors. The Star Trek line, however, did so. Hartwell suggested it as an avenue for qualifying as a published author. (Hellspark was later released in 1988 by Tor Books, to which Hartwell had moved on in the meantime.) At the time she had not seen an episode of the show for some seventeen years. She researched the series, and due to it being shown in broadcast syndication, she was able to record late-night re-runs using her videocassette recorder. She had committed to provide a ten-page outline plus a thirty-page sample to Hartwell within a week, and whilst watching the recorded episodes, she realised that Uhura had not been featured prominently and that Nichelle Nichols had never been given any memorable lines.

Kagan did remember Nichols in a NASA promotional film, and desired to "give Uhura the plum role she deserved". She was keen to have the characters sound like a real proposal for a Star Trek episode. Hartwell approved the outline, and Kagan reached out to family members and friends for more information on the series such as tapes and books and wanted to know what they had never seen in Star Trek but wanted to. She had three months to turn in a first draft, and during that time she watched the entire series. During that period, Hartwell had left Simon & Schuster for Tor Books, and Kagan subsequently wondered how the book would have turned out differently had Hartwell stayed on to edit. A similar Uhura-focused book had been published two books prior, entitled The Tears of the Singers.

Following the successful publishing of the book, Kagan outlined two sequels to the novel, both featuring her original characters from Uhura's Song. She submitted her outlines to the new editor once the office had stabilised after Hartwell's departure, but discovered that the policy was that authors were not allowed to bring back original characters from previous books, and so the sequels went unwritten.

== Reception ==
Ellen Cheeseman-Meyer, inTor.com, writing on the appearances of Uhura in Star Trek novels, described the plot of Uhura's Song as "undisputably weird". She described the book as an "epic coming-of-age journey" with "lots and lots of ballads". She did say that she felt that there were a number of Mary Sue-type characters present throughout the book. In Star Trek: Adventures in Time and Space, published in 1999, Uhura's Song was described as one of the two defining novels alongside The Tears of the Singers which "gave Uhura the chance to expand her range beyond hailing frequencies".
