= Dwellers in the Crucible =

1985 novel by Margaret Wander Bonanno

- Cover
- Author: Margaret Wander Bonanno
- Cover artist: Boris Vallejo
- Language: English
- Genre: Science fiction
- Publisher: Pocket Books
- Publication date: September 1985
- Publication place: United States
- Media type: Print (paperback)
- Pages: 308
- ISBN: 0-671-60373-6 (first edition, paperback)
- OCLC: 12603784
- Preceded by: Killing Time
- Followed by: Pawns and Symbols

Dwellers in the Crucible is a 1985 science fiction novel by American writer by Margaret Wander Bonanno, part of the Star Trek: The Original Series franchise. A bestseller, it was the author's breakout novel, retelling the central Star Trek story of the friendship between James T. Kirk and Spock through the experiences of two female civilians, Egyptian Cleante al Faisal and Vulcan T'Shael. It is noted for its emphasis on interpersonal relationships over action, and for the minimal role played in the story by the franchise's established characters.

== Plot ==
On the planet Vulcan, several representatives of each Federation world are kept as "Warrantors of the Peace". As close relatives of the leaders of their worlds, they serve as hostages against the actions of their planetary governments, and are immediately killed if their world attacks another Federation planet.

Six of these Warrantors - an Andorian, a human, a Vulcan and three Deltans - are kidnapped and held by the Romulan Empire. The Andorian is killed during the kidnap, and the three Deltans are tortured to death by their Klingon captors, acting for the Romulans. The plot focuses on the cultural differences and eventual friendship between the two surviving captives, T'Shael and Cleante.

== Themes ==
Bonanno's concept of "Warrantors of the Peace" appears to be an implementation of Roger Fisher's 1981 proposal that the officer who accompanies the President of the United States with nuclear launch codes should have those codes implanted in his heart, to be cut out by the President's hand in the event of war:

My suggestion was quite simple: Put that needed code number in a little capsule, and then implant that capsule right next to the heart of a volunteer. The volunteer would carry with him a big, heavy butcher knife as he accompanied the President. If ever the President wanted to fire nuclear weapons, the only way he could do so would be for him first, with his own hands, to kill one human being. The President says, "George, I’m sorry but tens of millions must die." He has to look at someone and realize what death is—what an innocent death is. Blood on the White House carpet. It’s reality brought home.

When I suggested this to friends in the Pentagon they said, "My God, that’s terrible. Having to kill someone would distort the President’s judgment. He might never push the button."

In a 2019 interview, Bonanno described the practice of taking hostages to maintain peace with an enemy power as "a custom that [goes] back to ancient times. In order to secure against invasion, local leaders would send one of their sons to be raised by a former ally. If either side invaded anyway, the boy was sacrificed. Seems rather primitive by our lights, but I guess it worked most of the time."

== Reception and legacy ==
Dwellers was positively received at publication. While Fantasy Review emphasised the regular cast's incidental appearance in the novel, they recommended it highly despite its "minor flaws": "Dwellers in the Crucible is an excellent study of values ... [t]here are things here to think about which belie the Star Trek image."

Later, recalling Dwellers in 2009, author Keith R. A. DeCandido would describe the impact the "cool" story had on him: "I didn't know that a Star Trek book could do that."

== Controversy ==
In 1992, Bonanno was contracted by Pocket Books to write a follow-up novel to Star Trek IV: The Voyage Home. Her manuscript, entitled Music of the Spheres, reintroduced Dwellers characters Cleante and T'Shael. As Dwellers had done, Music focused on Bonanno's characters rather than on the familiar characters from the television show. This had not been a difficulty in 1985, but by 1992 Paramount Pictures had introduced new standards for Star Trek tie-in novels, which outlawed extensive use of original characters.

The story was heavily rewritten, and that rewrite subsequently rewritten by Gene DeWeese. The derivative novel was eventually published as Probe, still naming Bonanno as the author. Despite her wishes, Pocket Books refused to strip her name from the book. Bonanno stated at the time that only one page of the published novel resembled what she had written.
