= Strangers from the Sky =

1987 novel by Margaret Wander Bonanno

- Cover page of third edition
- Author: Margaret Wander Bonanno
- Audio read by: George Takei with Leonard Nimoy as voice of Spock
- Cover artist: Boris Vallejo Jerry Vanderstelt (re-release)
- Language: English
- Genre: Science fiction
- Published: July 1987 (first edition); 1993 (second edition); August 2006 (third edition)
- Publisher: Pocket Books
- Publication place: United States
- Media type: Print (Paperback)
- Pages: 402 pp (first edition); 402 pp (second edition); 416 pp (third edition)
- ISBN: 978-0-671-64049-1 (1st edition); ISBN 978-0-671-73481-7 (2nd edition); ISBN 978-1-4165-2463-2 (3rd edition)
- OCLC: 12603784

Strangers from the Sky is a novel, originally released in 1987, by Margaret Wander Bonanno.

== Overview ==
The novel is an adventure involving the original Star Trek series cast and journeys through many eras of the Trek timeline. The story is presented as a book within a book featuring excerpts from a novel called Strangers from the Sky by fictional author Garamet Jen-Saunor which claims that the official records of how the Human and Vulcan races met for the first time were incorrect.

The beginning and ending of the book takes place during James T. Kirk's years in the admiralty when he begins to suffer from psychological issues after reading Jen-Saunor's book which is a gift from Doctor McCoy. Kirk becomes somewhat obsessed with the story and starts to have disturbing dreams in which he is present during the book's events which, in the dreams, result in disaster. When McCoy refers Kirk for evaluation, the results show him to be in a mentally unstable state and the authorities assume he is delusional like many other people who have become obsessed with the book.

When Spock is similarly affected and diagnosed, the only cure for them both is to be found in a mind meld. The meld reveals that both were actually present during the events described in Jen-Saunor's book. The second half of the novel takes place during Kirk's first days in command of the Enterprise when he, Spock and other members of his crew including Gary Mitchell and Elizabeth Dehner, are accidentally transported back to the year 2045 and participate in the true first contact events.

The book occasionally foreshadows and refers to the events of the original series pilot "Where No Man Has Gone Before".

== Production ==
The basic concept of this book—in which Vulcans accidentally land on Earth years before the official "First Contact"—is echoed in the Star Trek: Enterprise episode "Carbon Creek".

Strangers from the Sky was the first Star Trek book to be produced as an audiobook. It was read by George Takei and Leonard Nimoy. While Takei read the majority of the book, Nimoy occasionally interjected in-character as Spock at certain points during the plot.
