= Mirabile (novel) =

1991 novel by Janet Kagan

- Author: Janet Kagan
- Language: English
- Publisher: Tor Books
- Publication date: 1991
- Dewey Decimal: 813.54
- LC Class: PS3561.A363 M57

Mirabile is a 1991 science fiction novel by American writer Janet Kagan. It is a fix-up of her short stories set on the planet Mirabile, which were originally published in Asimov's Science Fiction beginning in 1989; the compilation was published by Tor Books.

== Setting ==
When humanity sent generation ships to colonize the planet Mirabile, the cargo included seed banks and cryopreserved embryos of every Earth species the colonists might need, genetically engineered to produce more Earth species on cue. However, many of the instructions were lost en route, and decades after arrival, the genetically-engineered fauna and flora are still causing problems — both by themselves, and in conflicts with native Mirabilan biota.

== Contents ==
- "The Loch Moose Monster" (originally published 1989)
- "The Return of the Kangaroo Rex" (1989)
- "The Flowering Inferno" (1990)
- "Getting the Bugs Out" (1990)
- "Raising Cane" (1991)
- "Frankenswine" (1991)

== Reception ==
Gardner Dozois said that the stories which were eventually collected into Mirabile were "some of the most popular (...) ever published in Asimov's". Jo Walton calls the stories "sweet", and states that the narrator has an "amazing authentic voice, distinctive, individual and funny", but ultimately judges the work as "fairly slight", comparing it unfavorably to Kagan's 1988 novel Hellspark. James Nicoll praised it as "truly glorious", but noted that "the efforts to transform the original short pieces into a novel are perfunctory".

In 2013, the New York Review of Science Fiction included Mirabile on its list of 200 significant science fiction books by women.
