= Pawns and Symbols =

1985 novel by Majliss Larson

- Cover
- Author: Majliss Larson
- Language: English
- Genre: Science fiction
- Publisher: Pocket Books
- Publication date: November 1985
- Publication place: United States
- Media type: Print (Paperback)
- Pages: 277
- ISBN: 0-671-55425-5 (first edition, paperback)
- OCLC: 12895540
- Preceded by: Dwellers in the Crucible
- Followed by: Mindshadow

Pawns and Symbols is a science fiction novel by American writer Majliss Larson, part of the Star Trek: The Original Series franchise.

== Plot ==
Jean Czerny, a Federation survivor of an earthquake, is suffering from amnesia. She becomes involved in a Klingon crisis, caused by an empire-wide famine. Captain Kirk and the Klingon Captain Kang clash over the potential war brewing and the fate of Jean.

== Reception ==
Ann-Marie Cahill of BookRiot.com praised the book for "one of the more memorable depictions of Klingons" as it shows Klingon culture beyond war and battles, and depicts Klingon scientists, doctors, and civilians.
