= Janet Kagan =

American novelist (1946–2008)

- Born: Janet Megson; April 18, 1946; New Jersey, U.S.
- Died: February 29, 2008 (aged 61)
- Occupation: Writer
- Spouse: Ricky Kagan
- Writing career
- Period: 1982–98
- Genre: Science fiction
- Notable works: Uhura's Song (1985); Hellspark (1988)
- Notable awards: Hugo Award for Best Novelette (1993)
- Website: www.janetkagan.com

Janet Kagan (born Janet Megson, April 18, 1946 – February 29, 2008) was an American author. Her works include two science fiction novels and two science fiction collections, plus numerous science fiction and fantasy short stories that appeared in publications such as Analog Science Fiction and Fact and Asimov's Science Fiction. Her story "The Nutcracker Coup" was nominated for both the Hugo Award for Best Novelette and the Nebula Award for Best Novelette, winning the Hugo.

== Awards ==
Kagan won the Asimov's Reader Poll award for best Novelette in 1990 for "The Loch Moose Monster", in 1991 for "Getting the Bugs Out" and in 1993 for "The Nutcracker Coup", which also won the 1993 Hugo award.

== Works ==
=== Novels ===
- Uhura's Song (1985) (Star Trek tie-in novel)
- Hellspark (1988)

=== Collections ===
- Mirabile (1991)
- The Collected Kagan (2016)

=== Short stories ===
==== Mirabile series ====
- "The Loch Moose Monster" (1989)
- "The Return of the Kangaroo Rex" (1989)
- "The Flowering Inferno" (1990)
- "Getting the Bugs Out" (1990)
- "Raising Cane" (1991)
- "Frankenswine" (1991)

==== Other short stories ====
- "Faith-of-the-Month Club" (1982) [only as by uncredited]
- "Junkmail" (1988)
- "The Nolacon Visitation" (1988) (with Patrick H. Adkins and others)
- "Naked Wish-Fulfillment" (1989)
- "What a Wizard Does" (1990)
- "From the Dead Letter File" (1990)
- "Winging It" (1991)
- "Fighting Words" (1992)
- "Love Our Lockwood" (1992) (collected in Mike Resnick's anthology Alternate Presidents the same year)
- "Out on Front Street" (1992)
- "The Last of a Vintage Year" (1992)
- "The Nutcracker Coup" (1992)
- "Christmas Wingding" (1993)
- "No Known Cure" (1993)
- "She Was Blonde, She Was Dead—and Only Jimmilich Opstromommo Could Find Out Why!!!" (1993)
- "Face Time" (1994)
- "Space Cadet" (1994)
- "Fermat's Best Theorem" (1995)
- "Standing in the Spirit" (1997)
- "The Stubbornest Broad on Earth" (1998)
- "How First Woman Stole Language from Tuli-Tuli the Beast" (2005)
