= Mindshadow (novel) =

1986 novel by J.M. Dillard

- Cover
- Author: J.M. Dillard
- Cover artist: Boris Vallejo
- Language: English
- Genre: Science fiction
- Publisher: Pocket Books
- Publication date: 1 January 1986
- Publication place: United States
- Media type: Print (Paperback)
- Pages: 252
- ISBN: 0-671-60756-1 (first edition, paperback)
- OCLC: 13116949
- Preceded by: Pawns and Symbols
- Followed by: Crisis on Centaurus

Mindshadow is a science fiction novel by American writer J.M. Dillard, part of the Star Trek: The Original Series franchise. It was the first novel written by Dillard, and featured the debut of Lt. Ingrid Tomson and Ens. Mohamed al-Baslama who would appear in several further Star Trek works.

== Plot ==
The planet Aritani has been under attack by cloaked pirate vessels. The Enterprise is dispatched by the Federation to offer aid, and membership into its organization to the planet's inhabitants. Upon arrival the Aritanians are skeptic, but willing to entertain the offer pending the success of the aid rendered. While on planet, Spock breaks off from the group to investigate strange tricorder readings. When he fails to return at the designated time, he is found to have fallen off a cliff and sustained several injuries, including aphasia and retrograde amnesia. Due to Spock's Vulcan lineage, Doctor McCoy requests for a specialist in Vulcan neuropsychology be assigned to the Enterprise to aid in the recovery process. Doctor Emma Saenz arrives to fill that role and prescribes Spock a drug called neodopazine, a neurotransmitter, to stabilize his condition after an apparent suicide attempt. Ashamed by the lack of improvement on his condition, Spock departs from the Enterprise to return to Vulcan and stay with his family. Meanwhile, despite the rendered aid, the pirate attacks on Aritani continue, resulting in the Aritanians opting to decline any further interaction with the Federation. The attacks are discovered to be Romulan in origin, and cause great debate within the Federation. An emergency diplomatic meeting is assembled on Vulcan to discuss the course of action, with the attendees to be delivered by the Enterprise. While on Vulcan, Spock's suspicions on his unchanged condition leads to him stopping the neodopazine. His suspicions are correct, and his condition improves allowing him to remember the events of his accident and the strange reading he discovered on Aritani. When he attempts to contact the recently arrived Enterprise to inform them of the development, a Romulan assassin makes an attempt on Spock and his father, Sarek's lives. James T. Kirk and Doctor McCoy are informed of the predicament, and upon visiting Spock learn of the Romulan base on the planet that the pirates originated from, and that Doctor Saenz is seemingly a Romulan spy. Upon confronting her it is revealed that she is a double agent serving the Federation while posing as a Romulan spy, and she assists Kirk in destroying the Romulan base. The base destroyed and the threat gone, the Aritanians choose to accept Federation aid in restoring the damage to their planet.

== Background ==
Before she wrote any Star Trek novels, Dillard described herself as a secret fan of the series since the age of thirteen, and would smuggle the books into her home so that her husband didn't know that she read them. The first Star Trek novel she read, Vonda McIntyre's, The Entropy Effect, was listed as an inspiration to her pursuit of writing an original Star Trek novel. At the time she was an English lecturer at the American University in Washington D.C., and decided to give writing a try after she was fired from the University for attempting to organise a trade union. This gave her the time to develop the novel Mindshadow, which was her first attempt at writing any novel. Dillard stated she didn't recall where the idea for the novel came from, but that she "wanted to hit Spock where it hurt the most—his mental abilities." "She used Writer's Market to ensure that she followed the correct format, and sent it into Pocket Books without showing it to anyone else.

After a year, she hadn't received a response and so chased the editor of Pocket Books for progress, only to find that they had lost her draft. So Dillard set about re-writing it, but before she finished the new version, she was contacted by the publishers as they had found her original version and wanted to publish it. One of the characters in the novel was based on her experiences with the University, after it hired her back and sacked the person who had fired her. In the novel, Lt. Ingrid Tomson was based on that person, who Dillard described as "super-competent, anal-retentive, really uptight". The character would go on to appear in other Star Trek books by Dillard as well as those by other authors such as Time for Yesterday by Ann Crispin, and Doctor's Orders by Diane Duane.
