= The World Next Door (video game) =

2019 visual novel and puzzle game

- Developer: Rose City Games
- Publisher: Viz Media
- Director: Corey Warning
- Producers: Sandara Lanz; Will Lewis
- Designer: Christian Scandariato
- Programmer: Michael Hill
- Artists: Lord Gris; Justin Baldwin
- Writer: S.A. Farnham
- Composer: Andrew Matteson
- Engine: Unity
- Platforms: macOS, Microsoft Windows, Nintendo Switch
- Release: March 28, 2019
- Genres: Visual novel, puzzle
- Mode: Single-player

The World Next Door is an indie visual novel and puzzle game developed by American studio Rose City Games and published by Viz Media. It was released for Nintendo Switch and Microsoft Windows on March 27, 2019 and March 28, 2019 respectively. It revolves around a human teenager who becomes trapped in a parallel universe, Emrys, and must escape before she perishes. It received mixed reviews from critics, who praised its story, combat and art, but criticized its short length as limiting the potential for plot development, and called its puzzles too brief and easy.

== Plot ==
The game revolves around a human teenager, Jun, who wins a ticket that allows her to visit a parallel universe called Emrys, the path to which only opens up for a few days every 20 years. She is marooned there when she fails to return to the portal before it closes. Since humans can only last a short time within Emrys, she teams up with Liza, an Emrys native and her pen pal, to find a way to reopen the portal and return home.

== Gameplay ==
The player, as Jun, battles an enemy in puzzle gameplay.

The game is divided into visual novel sections and puzzle dungeons. Most of the game takes place in the visual novel portions, which allow the player to choose dialog options (that influence rather than change the direction of the story), complete quests, and choose whom to spend time with each day, as well as who will assist the player in dungeons. This portion of the game takes place largely on the grounds of a high school and a couple of surrounding areas.

The other portion of the game, puzzle dungeons, involve Match 3 gameplay in which the floor of the dungeon is painted with runes. If the player steps on three runes of the same color, they can perform a magical action. The player can also drag the runes in order to match them, or combine more than three runes for an even more powerful spell.

== Reception ==
Reception

Aggregate score
Aggregator	Score
Metacritic	NS: 63/100

Review scores
Publication	Score
Game Informer	6/10
GameSpot	6/10
Nintendo World Report	6.5/10

The game received an aggregate score of 63/100 on Metacritic.

Reviewing the Switch version, Jordan Rudek of Nintendo World Report rated the game 6.5/10 points, praising the game's mix of genres as "interesting", but stating that he "finished the game feeling surprised and disappointed that there wasn’t more here". Stating that "the RPG elements aren’t utilized very well or with much thought", he criticized the game's quests as not really yielding any reward. He also criticized the fact that the game autosaves at the end, preventing them from returning to complete quests.

Kimberley Wallace of Game Informer rated the game 6/10 points, praising its "great art style", but calling the narrative "disappointing", stating that "the one-note characters and the predictable story never go anywhere interesting". She concluded that she "expected something to pay off in the long run [...] but I instead ended the game saying, 'That’s it?'"

Reviewing the PC version, Jordan Ramée of GameSpot rated the game 6/10 points, praising the puzzle mechanics as well-designed and strategic, especially once tougher enemies are introduced, and calling the dialog "well-written and funny". He also called early-game battles "too simple" and said the lack of character development made the characters feel "fairly generic", also stating that a large plot point was "left unresolved" by the end. He concludes by saying that "The World Next Door plays like the first arc of something more, ending right when it seems like it's about to deliver the experience you want."
