= The World Next Door (novel) =

1990 novel by Brad Ferguson

- Dust cover of first edition, 1990
- Author: Brad Ferguson
- Cover artist: David Mattingly
- Language: English
- Genre: Science fiction
- Publisher: Tor Books
- Publication date: 1990
- Publication place: United States
- Media type: Print (paperback)
- Pages: 342
- ISBN: 0-812-53795-5

The World Next Door is a 1990 science fiction novel by Brad Ferguson, combining in a novel way the subgenres of alternate history and of predicting the Third World War. It was first published in paperback by Tor Books in October 1990. The book is an expansion of a short story of the same name published in Isaac Asimov's Science Fiction Magazine in September 1987.

== Plot ==
The story takes place in 1997, at two interlinked alternate realities. In one of them, the Cuban Missile Crisis had escalated into a major nuclear exchange. What was left of the United States disintegrated into numerous virtually-independent enclaves, though President John F. Kennedy may still be alive in a bunker somewhere.

Most of the plot centers on Lake Placid, New York, and along parts of Route 86, where an oasis of civilization was painstakingly built, threatened by a well-organized band of rapacious robbers who claim to be the New York State National Guard.

Meanwhile, the "world next door" which avoided nuclear war in 1962 is going to experience it thirty-five years later because Soviet general secretary Mikhail Gorbachev's reforms went wrong in the worst possible way. This war would be much worse than the one in 1962, because nuclear weapons have had decades to become even more highly destructive.

Characters from the first ("1962 War") world keep experiencing in dreams the lives of their analogues in the world threatened now with war. At the end of the novel, many children from the second world are transported across and given refuge in the "1962 War"-world, where meanwhile the "National Guard" robbers had been dealt with rather ruthlessly. (The book's plot is constructed so as to lead the reader to condone the cold-blooded killing of unarmed prisoners, since otherwise the prisoners in question would have escaped and perpetrated terrible atrocities.)

== Reception ==
In a review for Aboriginal Science Fiction, Janice M. Eisen described The World Next Door as having an "intriguing plot" but that the worldbuilding was confusing in places. By contrast, Science Fiction Chronicle reviewed the novel more positively, praising "the blend of melodrama and mysticism in the final chapters."
