= Blood and Fire (Star Trek: The Next Generation) =

Scrapped episode of Star Trek: The Next Generation

"Blood and Fire" is an episode written by David Gerrold initially for the television series Star Trek: The Next Generation (TNG) (1987-1994), but was instead developed into a 2003 novel and later filmed as a two-part episode for the fan series Star Trek: New Voyages (2008 and 2009).

== Production ==
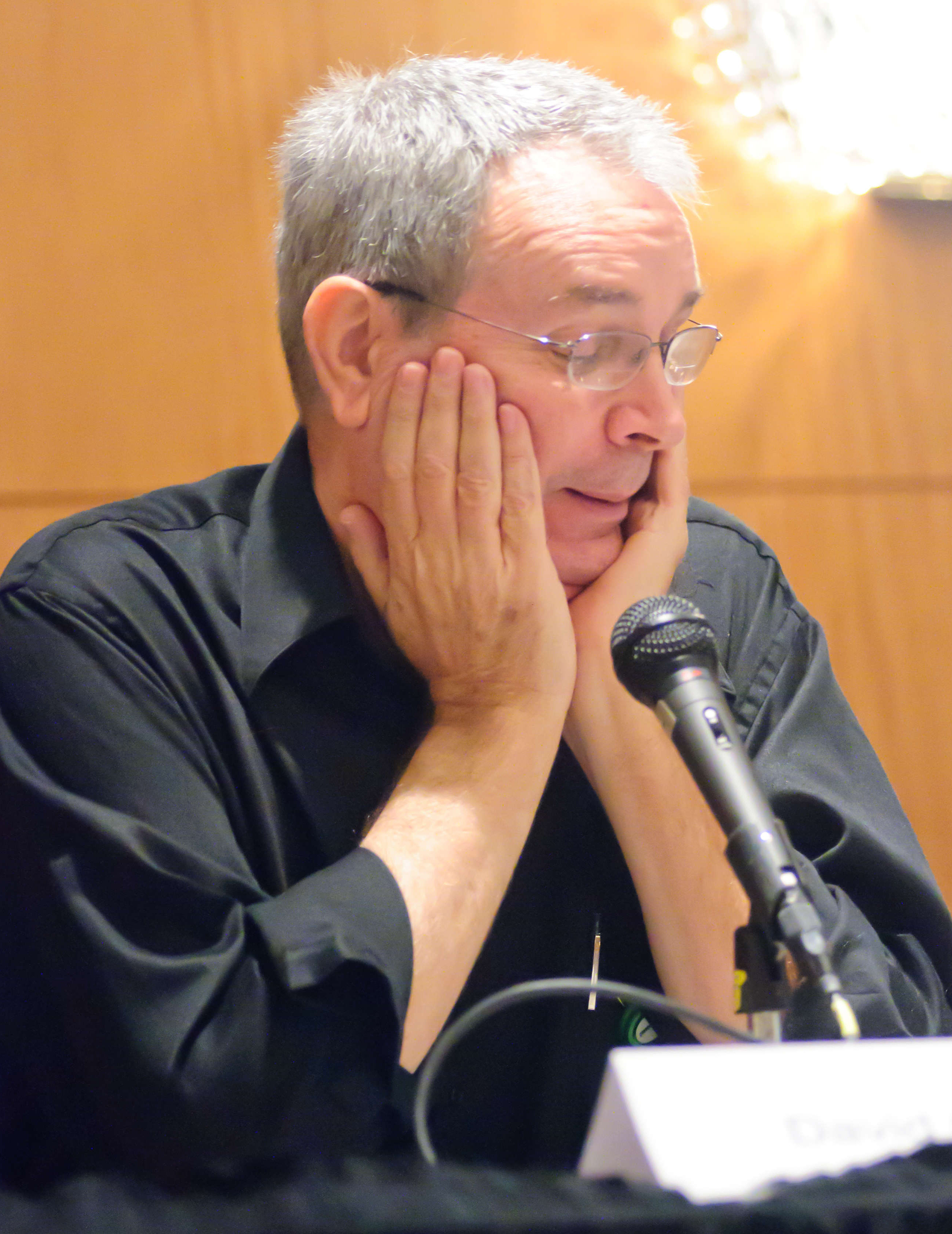
David Gerrold at DragonCon 2010. Gerrold left Star Trek: The Next Generation after troubles in producing "Blood and Fire" in its first season.

The script was commissioned and written, but never actually filmed. According to Gerrold, some of the production staff, including Rick Berman, had a negative reaction to its positive depiction of an openly gay couple. But Gerrold also recalled a memo from Berman where AIDS was one of the issues that should be addressed on the show. Herbert Wright rewrote the script under the name "Blood and Ice", which also was left unproduced.

== Plot ==
In the original script, the crew of the Enterprise-D came upon a derelict spaceship whose crew had all been killed off by Regulan bloodworms. Since these creatures are highly dangerous and can kill within hours, any ship or space station found to be infested with bloodworms must be sterilized and destroyed, per Starfleet orders. The concept of Regulan bloodworms, mentioned in dialogue in the original Star Trek series (TOS)—but never actually explained until this episode—was intended to be a metaphor for the public's fear of AIDS. Gerrold has since said that he also intended the episode to specifically address the public's fear of donating blood, and that he wanted to include a title card encouraging viewers to donate blood via the Red Cross.

== Legacy ==
The episode was noted for its inclusion of two openly homosexual crew members, which would have been a first in Star Trek history. Years later, an AIDS allegory would be included in the Star Trek: Enterprise episode "Stigma" (2003).

=== Star Trek: New Voyages ===
With Gerrold's permission, Carlos Pedraza rewrote "Blood and Fire" for the fan series Star Trek: New Voyages, then known as Star Trek: Phase II, and was released as the series' fourth and fifth episodes on December, 20 2008 and November 20, 2009.

In a 2007 interview, Gerrold detailed the background for the original script, rooted in the stigma of AIDS, the different incarnations of the story and being approached by the production team of Star Trek: New Voyages. The team initially just asked permission to produce "Blood and Fire", but from there Gerrold's involvement grew from declining to do a rewrite himself but giving permission to use the script, to reviewing the script, to minor rewrites, to more rewrites and addition and deletions. Gerrold later ended up directing the two-part episode totalling 98 minutes. Gerrold commended Carlos Pedraza for doing excellent work on the initial rewrite, translating the script from the original TNG setting to the TOS setting. He also noted the fan production's professionalism and respect for the storytelling.

== See also ==
- Sexuality in Star Trek
