= Nyota Uhura =

Star Trek character

- Star Trek character
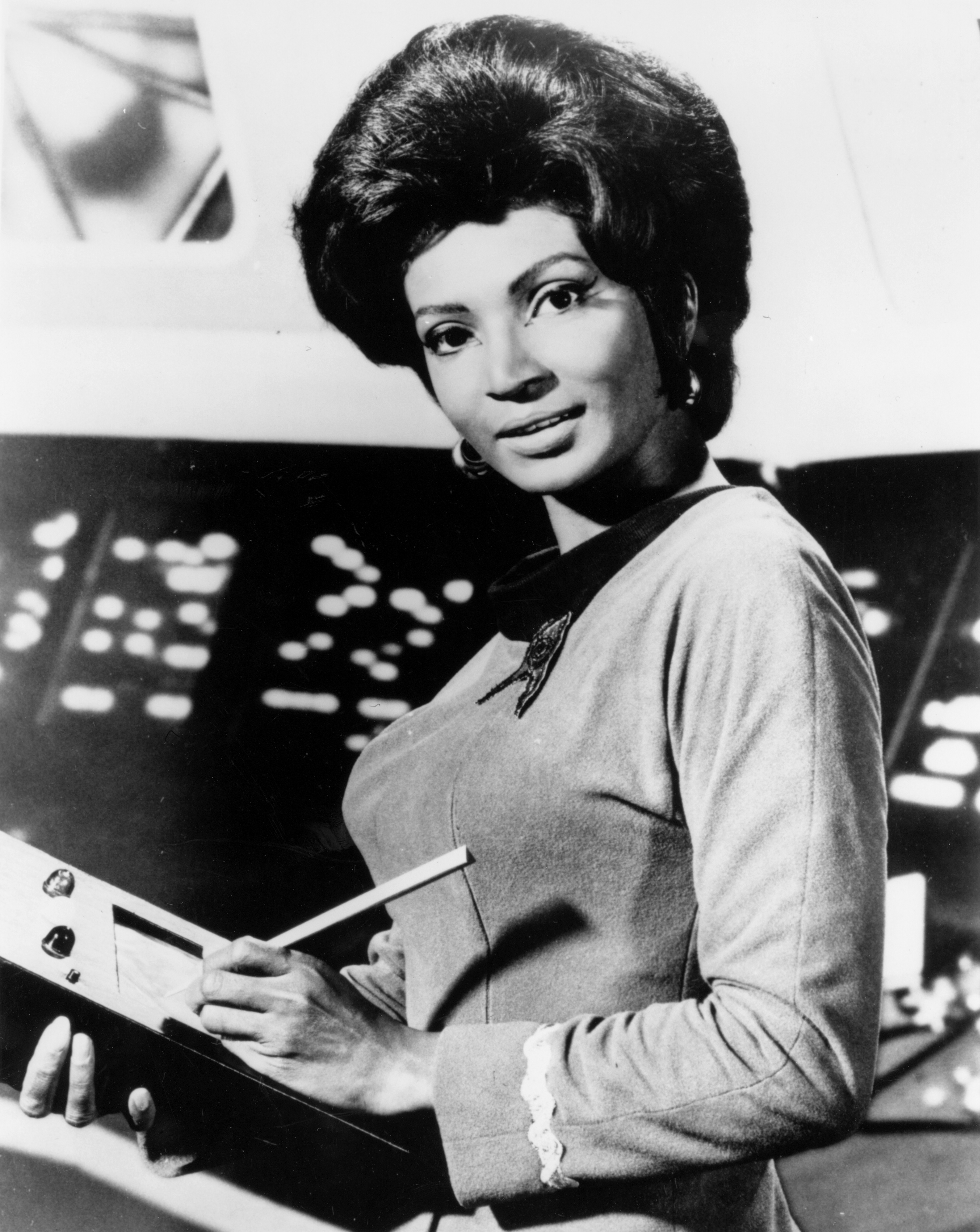
- Nichelle Nichols as Uhura on the set of Star Trek: The Original Series
- First appearance: Nichelle Nichols: "The Man Trap" (1966); (The Original Series); Zoe Saldaña: Star Trek (2009); Celia Rose Gooding: "Strange New Worlds" (2022); (Strange New Worlds)
- Created by: Gene Roddenberry
- Portrayed by: Nichelle Nichols (1966–1991); Zoe Saldaña (2009–2016); Celia Rose Gooding (2022–present)
- Voiced by: Nichelle Nichols (The Animated Series); Celia Rose Gooding ("Those Old Scientists")

In-universe information
- Gender: Female
- Titles: Lieutenant; Commander; Captain
- Occupation: Linguist; Cryptographer; Philologist
- Affiliation: United Federation of Planets; Starfleet
- Significant other: Spock (reboot films)

Nyota Uhura (/niˈoʊtə ʊˈhʊrə/), or simply Uhura, is a fictional character in the Star Trek franchise. In the original television series, the character was portrayed by Nichelle Nichols, who reprised the role for the first six Star Trek feature films. A younger Uhura is portrayed by Celia Rose Gooding in the 2022 prequel series Star Trek: Strange New Worlds, while an alternate timeline version of Uhura has been portrayed by actress Zoe Saldaña in the feature films Star Trek (2009), Star Trek Into Darkness (2013), and Star Trek Beyond (2016).

Uhura is a polyglot, translator and communications officer who specializes in linguistics, cryptography, and philology. She was an important part of the original series' multicultural crew and one of the first Black characters to be portrayed in a non-menial role on an American television series.

== Name ==
Gene Roddenberry had intended his new female communications officer to be called "Lieutenant Sulu". Herb Solow pointed out how similar this was to "Zulu" and thought it might act against the plan for racial diversity in the show, so the name Sulu remained with George Takei's character. "Uhura" comes from the Swahili word uhuru, meaning "freedom". Nichols states in her 1994 book Beyond Uhura that the name was inspired by Robert Ruark's 1962 book Uhuru, which she had with her on the day she read for the part. When producer Robert Justman explained to Roddenberry what the word uhuru meant, he changed it to Uhura and adopted that as the character's name. Coincidentally, the end credits of the film Star Trek VI: The Undiscovered Country incorrectly refer to Uhura as "Uhuru".

Uhura's first name was not used in Star Trek canon until Abrams's 2009 film. The mystery regarding Uhura's first name is the subject of a running joke in the film, as Captain Kirk repeatedly tries to find out what it is, before finally hearing Spock call her "Nyota" in a moment of intimacy.

Although other non-canon names had previously existed, "Nyota" had been the most common. Two other proposed names were "Penda" and "Samara". The FASA produced Star Trek: The Role Playing Game (1982) gave Uhura's first name as "Samara" while the fanzine collection The Best of Trek (18 volumes, 1978–1996) suggests that Uhura's first name is "Penda", coined when a group of fanzine authors suggested it to Nichols at an early convention.

Author William Rotsler created the name "Nyota" for his 1982 licensed tie-in book, Star Trek II Biographies published by Wanderer (Pocket) Books. Seeking approval for the name he contacted Gene Roddenberry and Nichelle Nichols. Roddenberry approved of the name. Nichols also approved and was very excited when Rotsler informed her that Nyota means "star" in Swahili. After originating in Star Trek II Biographies "Nyota" started appearing in Star Trek novels, such as Uhura's Song (1985) by Janet Kagan. While guest-starring on the game show Super Password on January 7, 1987, Nichols stated that Uhura's first name was "Nyota".

== Development ==
Soon after the first scripts for Star Trek were being written, Roddenberry spoke of a new character, a female communications officer and introduced Herb Solow and Robert Justman to Nichols, who had worked for him on The Lieutenant. Although "The Cage" (the first pilot episode of Star Trek, featuring a female first officer, Number One) was rejected, Roddenberry continued to seek diversity in his casting for the series, including a greater emphasis on racial diversity, with Nichols as Uhura and George Takei as Sulu. Uhura's role of "answering the phone" has been described as gender normative for the era.

Nichols planned to leave Star Trek in 1967 after its first season, wanting to return to musical theater. She changed her mind after talking to Martin Luther King Jr. who was a fan of the show. King explained that her character signified a future of greater racial harmony and cooperation. King told Nichols, "You are our image of where we're going, you're 300 years from now, and that means that's where we are and it takes place now. Keep doing what you're doing, you are our inspiration." As Nichols recounted, "Star Trek was one of the only shows that [King] and his wife Coretta would allow their little children to watch. And I thanked him and I told him I was leaving the show. All the smile came off his face. And he said, 'Don't you understand for the first time we're seen as we should be seen. You don't have a black role. You have an equal role.'"

== Depiction ==
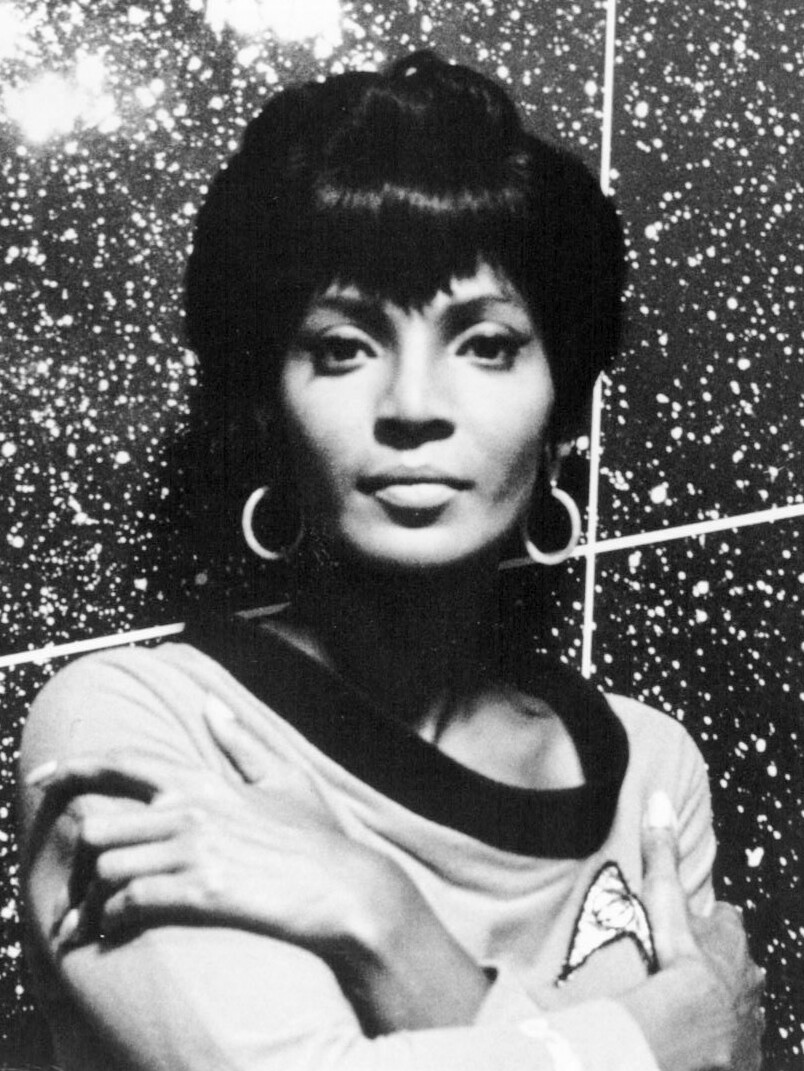
Nichelle Nichols as Uhura in a Star Trek promotional image, 1967

Uhura, from the United States of Africa, speaks Swahili and was born on January 19, 2233. James Blish's non-canon novels identify her as Bantu, as does Gene Roddenberry's novelization of Star Trek: The Motion Picture.

Uhura first appears in the episode "The Man Trap", joining the crew of the USS Enterprise as a lieutenant, and serves as chief communications officer under Captain Kirk. She is depicted as a capable bridge officer and readily assumed control of the helm, navigation and science stations on the bridge when the need arose. Uhura was also a talented singer, and enjoyed serenading her shipmates when off-duty; Spock occasionally accompanied her on the Vulcan lyre in episodes "Charlie X" and "The Conscience of the King".

In "The Lorelei Signal", a 1973 episode of Star Trek: The Animated Series, Uhura assumes command of the Enterprise when the male officers fall victim to a species of sirens and leads an all-female rescue party. After the sirens are defeated, the Enterprise crew help the sirens, and Uhura bonds with the sirens, who are happy at the thought that they might meet men and have children.

She is later promoted to lieutenant commander in Star Trek: The Motion Picture, and to full commander in Star Trek II: The Wrath of Khan.

Star Trek III: The Search for Spock sees Uhura take an assignment in the Space Dock transporter room as part of a plot to steal the Enterprise. After locking a colleague in a closet, Uhura uses the transporter station to beam Kirk, Leonard McCoy and Hikaru Sulu to the Enterprise so they can use it to rescue Spock from the Genesis Planet. As planned, Uhura later meets up with her crewmates on Vulcan and witnesses Spock's successful renewal.

Uhura has a smaller role in the first, second and third films. Uhura's Song, a novel published in 1985, developed her character further, placing her at the center of the action and introducing Uhura's interest in alien languages. Elements from this novel influenced her depiction in later films and novels.

Following these events and the destruction of the Enterprise, Uhura joins her crewmates on a stolen Klingon ship amid a crisis on Earth in Star Trek IV: The Voyage Home. Traveling to the 20th century, they attempt to save a pair of humpback whales in order to repopulate the species. During a trip to San Francisco, Uhura and Pavel Chekov infiltrate the aircraft carrier USS Enterprise and use emissions from the carrier's nuclear reactor to recharge the Klingon vessel's power supply. Kirk and Spock then procure the whales so the crew can return to the 23rd century and save Earth.

In light of their heroics, Starfleet Command exonerates Uhura and the rest of Kirk's crew for their illegal activities. Kirk is demoted to the rank of captain after a prior promotion to admiral, but is assigned to command the USS Enterprise-A. Uhura joins Kirk's crew, and once again serves as chief communications officer throughout the events of Star Trek V: The Final Frontier and Star Trek VI: The Undiscovered Country. In The Final Frontier, a romantic interest between Uhura and Montgomery Scott is briefly implied while Uhura seemingly is under the influence of Sybok, but the subplot is never fully developed in the following movies, leading the viewer to assume that the pair continues as friends.

A hidden Star Trek: Picard season 2 Easter egg reveals Nichelle Nichols’ Uhura became a starship captain after The Undiscovered Country, where Cadet Jean-Luc Picard first experienced lightspeed travel.

=== Reboot (Kelvin timeline) films ===
Zoe Saldaña as Uhura in the 2009 film Star Trek.

In the 2009 film Star Trek, Zoe Saldaña plays a young Uhura who is introduced as a cadet at the academy, but is promoted to a communications officer as the movie unfolds. The film is also notable for officially establishing the character's given name, Nyota. This Uhura is initially cold towards Kirk (and is verbally more than a match for him) after he attempts to flirt with her while intoxicated. However, by the end of film, she comes to respect Kirk as captain of the Enterprise. Although Nichols was not consulted over the character's casting, Saldaña personally reached out to Nichols, who in turn helped her prepare for the role.

A former student of Spock's, Uhura is also romantically involved with him. In Star Trek, the ongoing comic book series by IDW Publishing, they are shown going on a date during her studies at the academy. When Uhura is initially assigned to the USS Farragut in an attempt by Spock to avoid the appearance of favoritism, she demands that he assign her to the Enterprise, arguing she would have been assigned there had they not been involved. She persists in her complaints until Spock relents. Had she remained on the Farragut, she would have been killed, as that vessel is subsequently destroyed by the villain Nero. Uhura quickly receives a field promotion due to her skill with the Romulan language and remains on the bridge for most of the film.

The 2009 depiction of Nyota Uhura generated much online debate, with some fans praising her portrayal, while other fans disapproved of her romantic relationship with Spock, or suggested that her expanded role in the film was evidence that she had become a "Mary Sue" character. Other fans suggested that a romance with Spock was hinted in TOS, but could not be followed up on due to racism at the time, and that it would have been impossible at the time to depict Uhura in a romantic relationship. When discussing her response to the 2009 film, Nichelle Nichols confirmed that "there was always a connection between Uhura and Spock" and that the times did not allow for anything more than "hints". Nichols also discussed meeting with Saldaña to discuss Uhura, and praised Saldaña's portrayal. One writer said the intersectionality of Uhura as a Black woman was important when discussing her romance with Spock, because romances between Black women and white men were largely portrayed as cautionary tales in Hollywood films.

In the first sequel, Star Trek Into Darkness, Uhura has been serving on the Enterprise for a year and is still romantically involved with Spock. She and Kirk have a good working relationship and share their frustrations with Spock's emotional unavailability (Uhura as his lover, Kirk as his best friend). Uhura is called upon several times to act as a field officer, attempting to use her fluency in Klingon to assist in the hunt for the fugitive John Harrison. She later contacts Spock Prime (at her Spock's request) to consult him over Harrison's identity, and at the climax of the film, helps Spock defeat and capture Harrison after a long chase and fierce hand-to-hand combat. In the second sequel, Star Trek Beyond, her exceptional hearing, first referenced in the 2009 film, reveals the identity of the main antagonist. Spock and Uhura amicably discuss ending their relationship and have some tension over Spock's intention to leave Starfleet to help the Vulcan survivors, in the wake of the death of Spock Prime. Spock later instead chooses to remain in Starfleet, and begins to renew his relationship with Uhura.

In a 2012 poll conducted by SFX Magazine to find the 100 sexiest female characters in science fiction and fantasy, Uhura, as portrayed by Saldaña in the 2009 film, was voted number one.

=== Strange New Worlds ===
In Star Trek: Strange New Worlds, the character is played by Celia Rose Gooding as a cadet serving on the Enterprise as part of an advanced placement. The series reveals Uhura's backstory: she is from Kenya and her parents, both university professors, and older brother died when she was younger – possibly in an explosion or shuttle crash ("Subspace Rhapsody"). At a dinner in Captain Pike's quarters, Uhura admits that she joined Starfleet as a way of honoring her grandmother, who was a Starfleet officer who raised her when her parents died, but is unsure about continuing in the service. This draws negative reactions from other members of the crew, including Spock. However, after her exemplary performance on her first away mission, Spock softens his tone and tells her that she will make an excellent officer if she decides to stay. Season 2, she returns to the Enterprise as an Ensign and the Enterprise's communications officer.

== Cultural impact ==
=== Role model ===
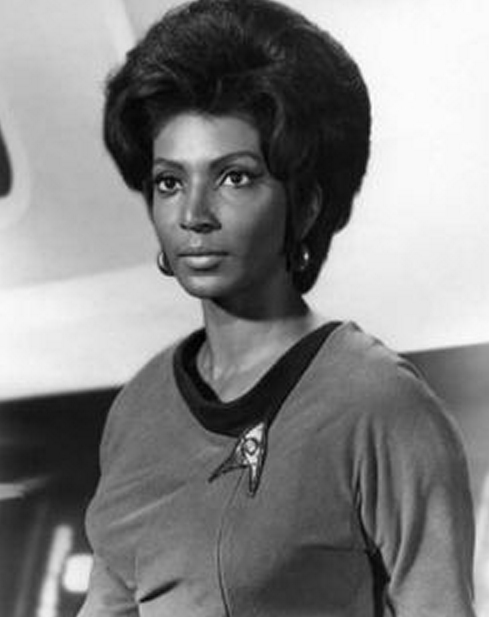
Nichols (pictured) planned to leave Star Trek in 1967 after its first season, but changed her mind after talking to Martin Luther King Jr., who explained that her character signified a future of greater racial harmony and cooperation

When Nichols considered quitting the show in the late 1960s, she was told someone wanted to meet her, claiming to be her biggest fan. By her account the fan was Martin Luther King Jr., who convinced her not to leave the show by stating: "You cannot do that. ... For the first time, we are being seen the world over as we should be seen." Nichols decided to stay on the show, explaining her reasons to Roddenberry, who replied "finally, someone gets it."

Whoopi Goldberg describes Uhura as an inspiration for her acting career and status as a Star Trek fan. Goldberg later recalled watching Star Trek as a teenager and telling family members: "I just saw a Black woman on television; and she ain't no maid!" Goldberg later played Guinan on Star Trek: The Next Generation.

NASA employed Nichols in a campaign to encourage women and African-Americans to join the organization. In 1978 NASA Astronaut Group 8 yielded the first recruits composed of women and ethnic minorities in the United States. Three were Black (Guion Bluford, Ronald McNair and Dr. Frederick D. Gregory). Mae Jemison, the first Black woman to fly aboard the Space Shuttle, cited Star Trek as an influence in her decision to join. Jemison herself had a minor role on an episode of The Next Generation called "Second Chances", playing a transporter operator named Lieutenant Palmer. Jemison was the first of several real-life astronauts to appear on Star Trek.

On February 29, 2012, Nichols met with President Obama in the White House Oval Office. She later Tweeted about the meeting, ""Months ago Pres Obama was quoted as saying that he'd had a crush on me when he was younger." Nichols also wrote, "I asked about that & he proudly confirmed it! President Obama also confirmed for me that he was definitely a Trekker! How wonderful is that?!"

=== Interracial kiss ===
In the 1968 episode "Plato's Stepchildren", Uhura and Captain Kirk kiss. For many years this was claimed to be the first example of a scripted inter-racial kiss on United States television, although other examples have come to light. Originally, the scene was to be filmed both with the kiss, and without it so that the network could later decide to either air the kiss, or exclude it. However, Shatner and Nichols deliberately flubbed every take without the kiss, rendering them useless so that the kiss had to be included.

== Reception ==
In 2013, Uhura was ranked among the top 50 sexiest characters of the science-fiction genre. They note the character is "a whipsmart wise-ass who can hold her own against the guys" of the Enterprise.

In 2016, Screen Rant rated Uhura as the 16th best character in Star Trek overall as presented in television and film up to that time, highlighting the character as a "lingual expert who could handle herself on away missions". In 2018, Comic Book Resources ranked Uhura as the 23rd best Starfleet character of Star Trek. In 2018, The Wrap placed Uhura as 20th out 39 in a ranking of main cast characters of the Star Trek franchise.

In 2016, Uhura was ranked as the 14th most important character of Starfleet within the Star Trek science fiction universe by Wired magazine.

In 2017, Screen Rant ranked Uhura the second most attractive person in the Star Trek universe, in between Benjamin Sisko and Jean-Luc Picard.

In 2017, Comic Book Resources ranked the performance of Mirror Uhura the 14th "fiercest" female character of the Star Trek universe.

In 2018, Comic Book Resources ranked Uhura the 23rd best member of Starfleet.

In 2019, Uhura was ranked the fifth sexiest Star Trek character by SyFy.
