= Universal library =

Storehouse of all books

A universal library is a library with universal collections. This may be expressed in terms of it containing all existing information, useful information, all books, all works (regardless of format) or even all possible works. This ideal, although unrealizable, has influenced and continues to influence librarians and others and be a goal which is aspired to. Universal libraries are often assumed to have a complete set of useful features (such as finding aids, translation tools, alternative formats, etc.).

== History ==
The Library of Alexandria is generally regarded as the first library approaching universality, although this idea may be more mythical than real. It is estimated that at one time, this library contained between 30 and 70 percent of all works in existence. The re-founded modern library has a non-universal collections policy.

As a phrase, the "universal library" can be traced back to the naturalist Conrad Gessner's Bibliotheca universalis of 1545.

In the 17th century, the ideal of universality continued to be attractive. The French librarian Gabriel Naudé wrote:

And therefore I shall ever think it extremely necessary, to collect for this purpose all sorts of books, (under such precautions, yet, as I shall establish) seeing a Library which is erected for the public benefit, ought to be universal; but which it can never be, unlesse it comprehend all the principal authors, that have written upon the great diversity of particular subjects, and chiefly upon all the arts and sciences; [...] For certainly there is nothing which renders a Library more recommendable, then when every man findes in it that which he is in search of ...

== Fiction ==
Science fiction has used the device of a library which is universal in the sense that it not only contains all existing written works, but all possible written works. This idea appeared in Kurd Lasswitz's 1901 story "The Universal Library" and Borges's essay "The Total Library" before its more famous expression in Borges's story "The Library of Babel". Such a library, however, would be as useless as it would be complete. A similar idea was a planet called Memory Alpha, (from the Star Trek episode "The Lights of Zetar") which was the Federation's "storehouse of computer databases containing all cultural history and scientific data it has acquired.". It has been commented that the Internet already approaches this state.

In Discworld, Terry Pratchett's fantasy world, all libraries in the multiverse are connected in "L-space", effectively creating a single semi-universal library.

== Modern times ==
With the advent of cheap widely available digital storage, the ideal of universality, although still nearly impossible to attain, has become closer to being feasible. Many projects are now attempting to collect a section of human knowledge into one database. These projects vary in breadth and scope, and none are complete. Examples include digitization projects such as Project Gutenberg and Carnegie-Mellon's Universal library, digital libraries which are using book scanning to collect public domain works; The European Library, an integrated catalog for Europe's national libraries; the Wikimedia Foundation, which, using the Wiki system, is attempting to collect the breadth of important human knowledge under various open content projects such as Wikipedia and Wiktionary; and some shadow libraries. However, many technical and legal problems remain for the dissemination of all possible knowledge on the Internet.

Some of these issues are presented in the book Along Came Google: A History of Library Digitization by Deanna Marcum and Roger C. Schonfeld. Librarians are hesitant to cede control of unrestricted access of information to a corporation. Corporations could monopolize this information and provide another roadblock to libraries through undermining public funding with pay walls, or lawsuits for previously open domain information. Similarly, other corporations would not allow one corporation to have control over the entire book industry. This can be seen in digital libraries such as JSTOR, HathiTrust, and the Open Content Alliance.

The book also calls into question the international legitimacy of a digitization project undertaken by the United States. In 2005 the President of France urged other European countries to collaborate to create a European digital library “as a way to ensure that European cultures would not be sidelined by Google.” This conversation led to the creation of the Europeana, which houses digital cultural heritage items from across Europe.

A complete universal library also calls into question the ethical conundrum of a library that may not contain previous editions of a book. Those in the library profession as well as patrons are concerned about the increasing number of books being edited after publication without notifying readers. This practice, called stealth editing or stealth corrections, is seen as harmless by publishers, but is a practice that has the potential to be exploited. Due to the finite amount of storage available for a universal digital library, there is a greater chance that previous editions of books are lost.

=== Current barriers ===
Current barriers to the construction of a universal digital library include:

- Books have been lost. While the best-known lost library may be the Library of Alexandria, wars, civil strife and natural disasters destroy libraries and archives on a regular basis. Further losses are due to neglect.
- Copyright: Many books are under copyright and current widespread business models require scarcity of books to remunerate authors.
- Censorship: Most jurisdictions have prohibited at least some banned books.
- Unpublished manuscripts: If unpublished manuscripts are included in the definition of book, catching newly written manuscripts is likely to be a challenge.
- Current digitization efforts are largely library-based, and so materials deemed outside the scope of libraries are very poorly represented.
- Technological disparities: Differences in technology standards, formats, and digital infrastructure across institutions and countries make integration difficult. Additionally, older digital formats may become unreadable over time due to hardware and software obsolescence, jeopardizing long-term access.

== See also ==
- Anna's Archive
- Bibliotheca Alexandrina
- Encyclopedia Galactica
- Google Book Search
- Internet Archive
- Library of Babel
- Library Genesis
- Million Book Project
- Open Content Alliance
- Open Library
- Project Gutenberg
- World Digital Library
