= Book scanning =

Process of converting physical media into digital media

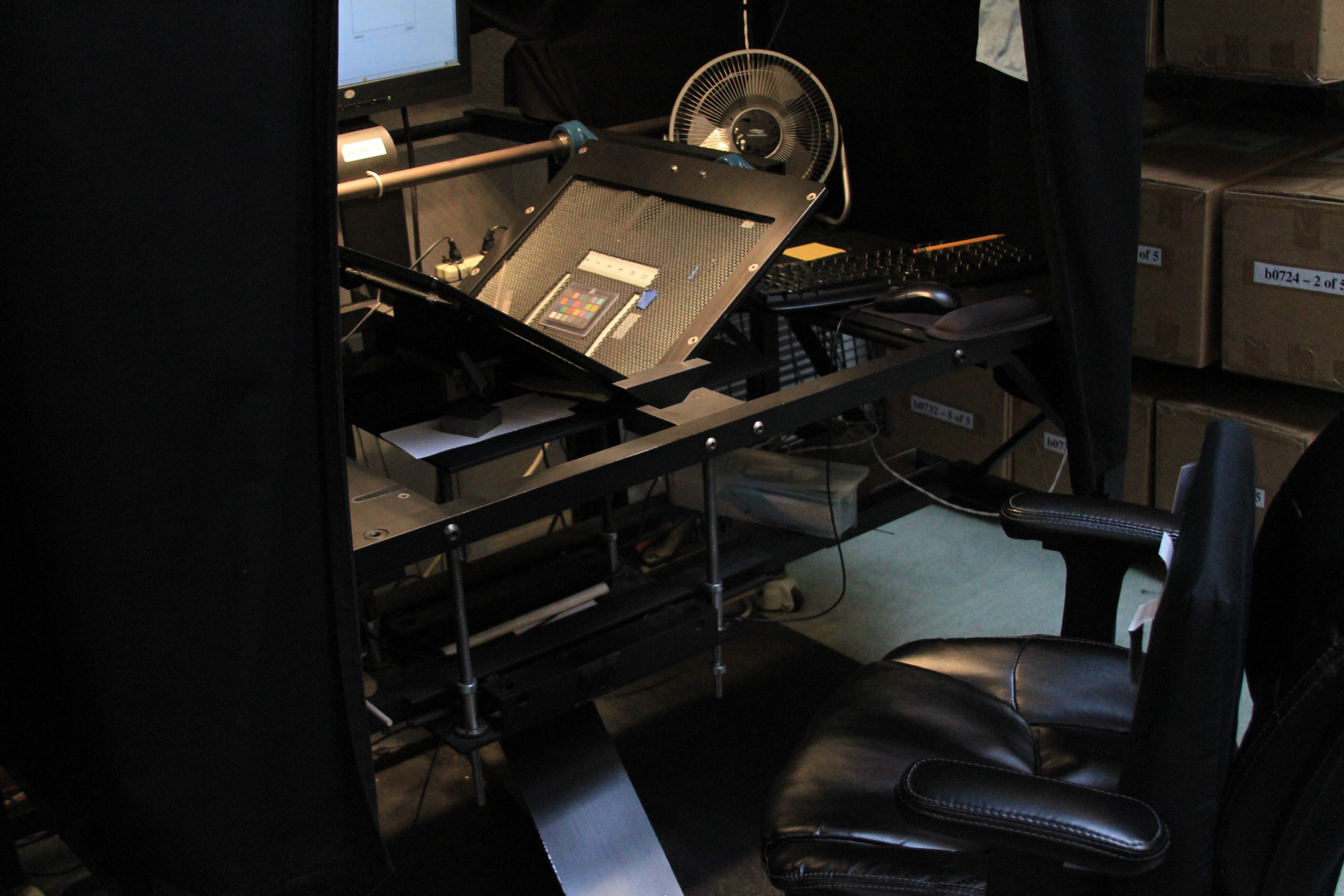
Internet Archive Scribe book scanner in 2011

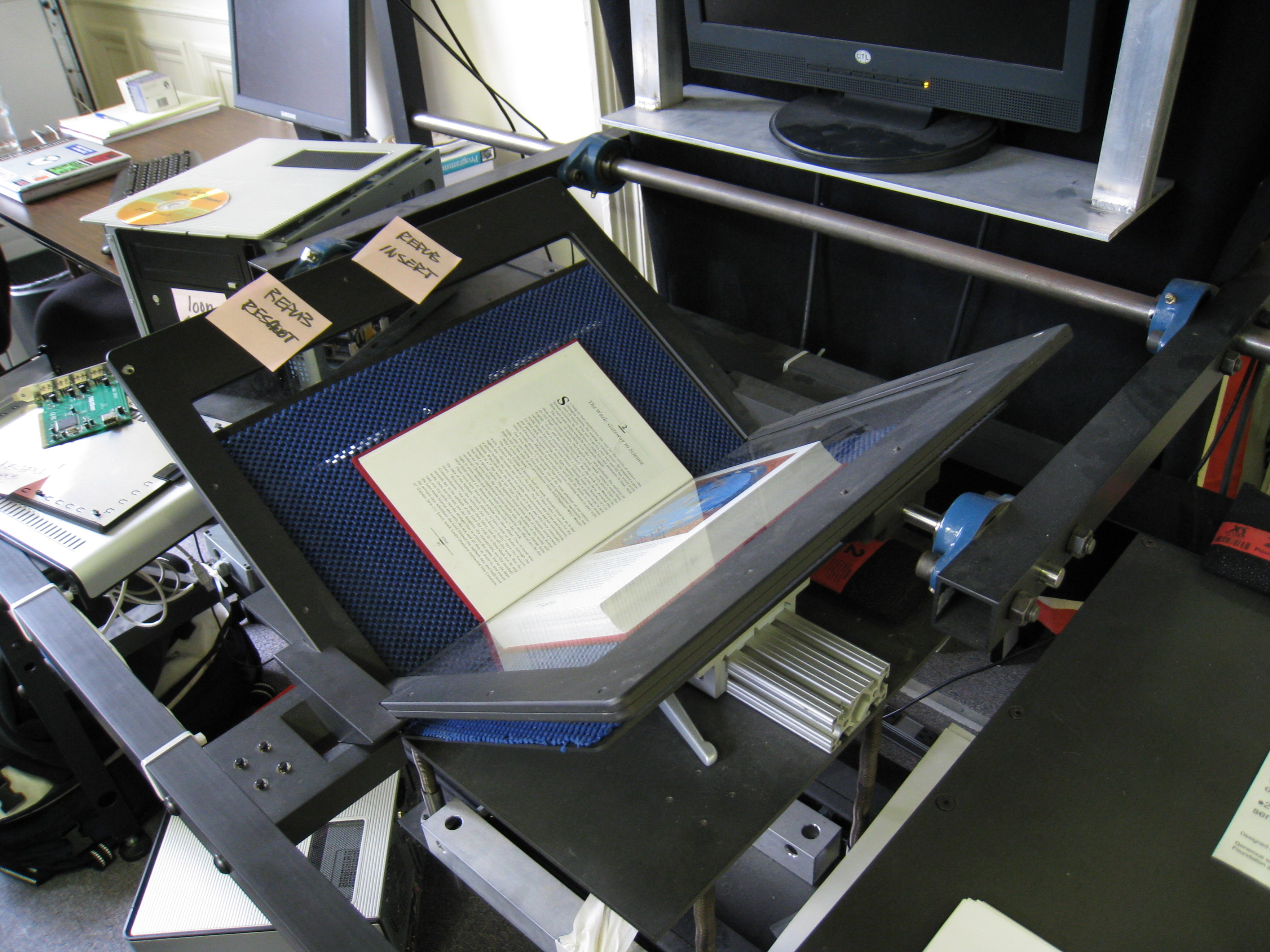
Internet Archive book scanner

Book scanning or book digitization (also: magazine scanning or magazine digitization) is the process of converting physical books and magazines into digital media such as images, electronic text, or electronic books (e-books) by using an image scanner. Large scale book scanning projects have made many books available online. Digital books can be easily distributed, reproduced, and read on-screen. Image scanners may be manual or automated. After scanning, software adjusts the document images by lining it up, cropping it, picture-editing it, and converting it to text and final e-book form. Scanning resolution for book digitization varies depending on the purpose and nature of the material. High-end scanners capable of thousands of pages per hour can cost thousands of dollars. Projects like Project Gutenberg, Million Book Project, Google Books, and the Open Content Alliance scan books on a large scale. Image scanners may be manual or automated.

== Description ==
Book scanning is the process of converting physical books and magazines into digital media such as images, electronic text, or electronic books (e-books) by using an image scanner. Large scale book scanning projects have made many books available online.

== Use ==
Digital books can be easily distributed, reproduced, and read on-screen. Common file formats are DjVu, Portable Document Format (PDF), and Tag Image File Format (TIFF). To convert the raw images optical character recognition (OCR) is used to turn book pages into a digital text format like ASCII or other similar format, which reduces the file size and allows the text to be reformatted, searched, or processed by other applications.

Image scanners may be manual or automated. In an ordinary commercial image scanner, the book is placed on a flat glass plate (or platen), and a light and optical array moves across the book underneath the glass. In manual book scanners, the glass plate extends to the edge of the scanner, making it easier to line up the book's spine.

== Software ==
After scanning, software adjusts the document images by lining it up, cropping it, picture-editing it, and converting it to text and final e-book form. Human proofreaders usually check the output for errors.

== Resolution ==
Scanning resolution for book digitization varies depending on the purpose and nature of the material. While 300 dpi (118 dots/centimeter) is generally adequate for text conversion, archival institutions recommend higher resolutions for preservation and rare materials. The National Archives of Australia suggests 400 ppi for bound books and 600 ppi for rare or significant documents, while the Federal Agencies Digitization Guidelines Initiative (FADGI) recommends a minimum of 400 ppi for archival materials.

These higher resolutions ensure the capture of fine details and support long-term preservation efforts, while a tiered approach balances quality with practical constraints such as storage capacity and resource limitations. This strategy allows institutions to optimize digitization efforts, applying higher resolutions selectively to rare or significant materials while using standard resolutions for more common documents.

== Book scanners ==
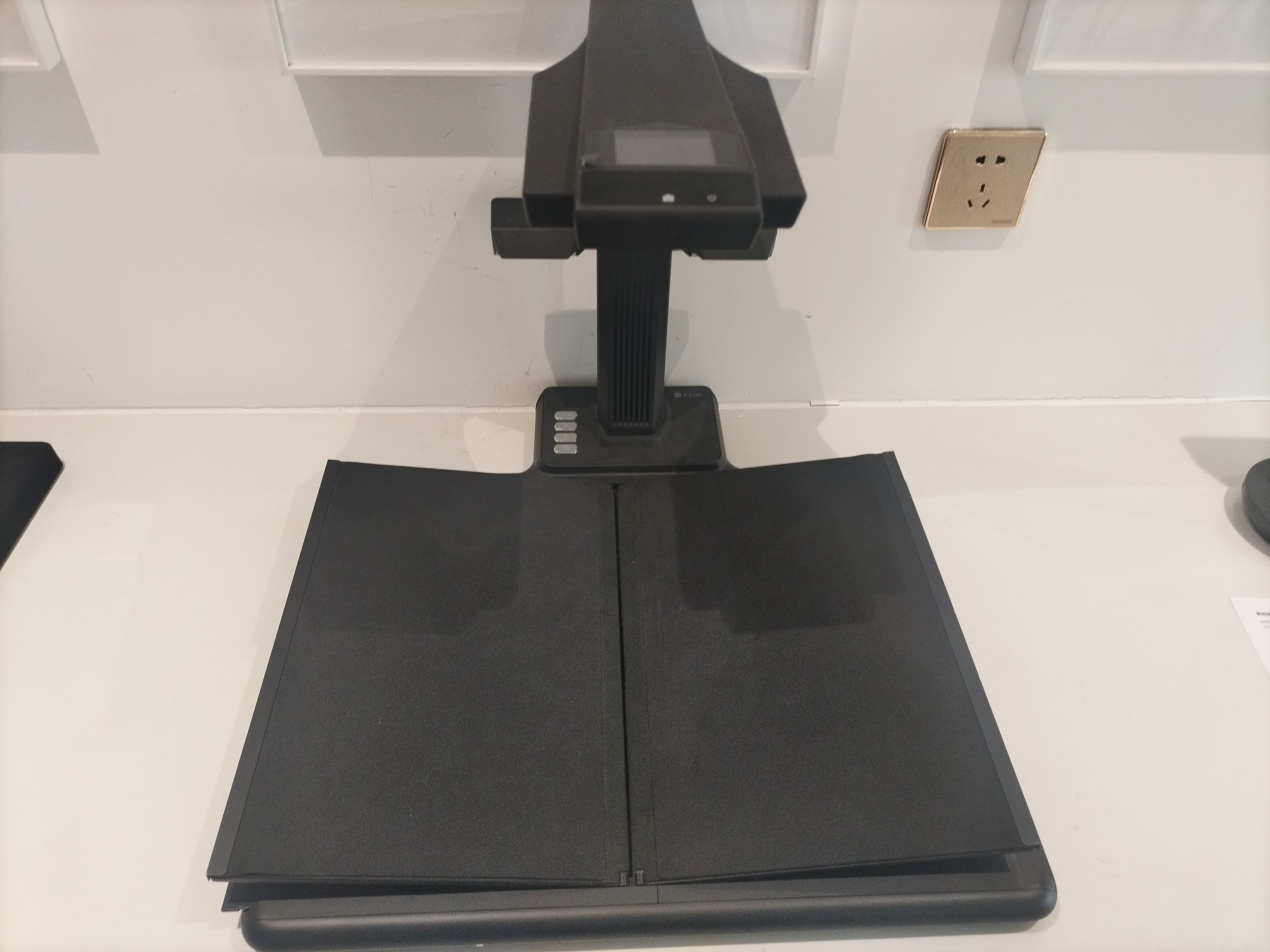
CZUR M3000 book scanner

Sketch of a typical manual book scanner

High-end scanners capable of thousands of pages per hour can cost thousands of dollars, but do-it-yourself (DIY), manual book scanners capable of 1,200 pages per hour have been built for US$300.

=== Commercial book scanners ===
Having evolved from a simple copy stand or document camera, commercial book scanners are not like normal scanners. A hobbyist or home-built variant might use two cameras, with crisscrossing optical pathways so that each points perpendicularly to a page of the cradled book, the left camera capturing the right page, and the right camera simultaneously capturing the left, and independently taking images that are later reorganized by the operator into a single digital volume. A modern commercial book scanner has a single very high quality digital camera, with light sources on either side of the camera, mounted to a frame in order to provide easy access for a person, or machine, to flip through the pages of the book. Some models involve V-shaped book cradles, which provide support for book spines and also center book position automatically, while image algorithms can provide deskewing to remove the natural curve of an open book page. The advantage of a book scanner compared to a flatbed or ADF is that the capture process can be very fast, compared to the productivity of overhead scanners, especially since both pages can be captured in one event, often aided by a footswitch shutter button.

== Large-scale projects ==
Projects like Project Gutenberg (est. 1971), Million Book Project (est. circa 2001), Google Books (est. 2004), and the Open Content Alliance (est. 2005) scan books on a large scale.

One of the main challenges to this is the sheer volume of books that must be scanned. In 2010 the total number of works appearing as books in human history was estimated to be around 130 million. All of these must be scanned and then made searchable online for the public to use as a universal library. Currently, there are three main ways that large organizations are relying on: outsourcing, scanning in-house using commercial book scanners, and scanning in-house using robotic scanning solutions.

As for outsourcing, books are often shipped to be scanned by low-cost sources to India or China. Alternatively, due to convenience, safety and technology improvement, many organizations choose to scan in-house by using either overhead scanners which are time-consuming, or digital camera-based scanning machines which are substantially faster and is a method employed by Internet Archive as well as Google. Traditional methods have included cutting off the book's spine and scanning the pages in a scanner with automatic page-feeding capability, with subsequent rebinding of the loose pages.

Once the page is scanned, the data is either entered manually or via OCR, another major cost of the book scanning projects.

Due to copyright issues, most scanned books are those that are out of copyright; however, Google Books is known to scan books still protected under copyright unless the publisher specifically prohibits this.

=== Collaborative projects ===
There are many collaborative digitization projects throughout the United States. Two of the earliest projects were the Collaborative Digitization Project in Colorado and NC ECHO – North Carolina Exploring Cultural Heritage Online, based at the State Library of North Carolina.

These projects establish and publish best practices for digitization and work with regional partners to digitize cultural heritage materials. Additional criteria for best practices have more recently been established in the UK, Australia and the European Union. Wisconsin Heritage Online is a collaborative digitization project modeled after the Colorado Collaborative Digitization Project. Wisconsin uses a wiki to build and distribute collaborative documentation. Georgia's collaborative digitization program, the Digital Library of Georgia, presents a virtual library on the state's history and life, including more than a hundred digital collections from 60 institutions and 100 agencies of government. The Digital Library of Georgia is a GALILEO initiative based at the University of Georgia Libraries.

In the twentieth century, the Hill Museum and Manuscript Library photographed books in Ethiopia that were subsequently destroyed amidst political violence in 1975. The library has since worked to photograph manuscripts in Middle Eastern countries.

In South Asia, the Nanakshahi trust is digitizing manuscripts of Gurmukhī script.

In Australia, there have been many collaborative projects between the National Library of Australia and universities to improve the repository infrastructure that digitized information would be stored in. Some of these projects include, the ARROW (Australian Research Repositories Online to the World) project and the APSR (Australian Partnership for Sustainable Repository) project.

== Methods ==
Image scanners may be manual or automated. In an ordinary commercial image scanner, the book is placed on a flat glass plate (or platen), and a light and optical array moves across the book underneath the glass. In manual book scanners, the glass plate extends to the edge of the scanner, making it easier to line up the book's spine.

=== Scanning preparation ===
A problem with scanning bound books is that when a book that is not very thin is laid flat, the part of the page close to the spine (the gutter) is significantly curved, distorting the text in that part of the scan. One solution is to separate the book into separate pages by cutting or unbinding. A non-destructive method is to hold the book in a V-shaped holder and photograph it, rather than lay it flat and scan it. The curvature in the gutter is much less pronounced this way. Pages may be turned by hand or by automated paper transport devices. Transparent plastic or glass sheets are usually pressed against the page to flatten it.

=== Destructive scanning methods ===
For book scanning on a low budget, the least expensive way to scan a book or magazine is to cut off the binding. This converts the book or magazine into a sheaf of separate sheets which can be loaded into a standard automatic document feeder (ADF) and scanned using inexpensive and common scanning technology. The method is not recommended for rare or valuable books as the process is irreversible and its remains are discarded. There are two technical difficulties with this process, first with the cutting and second with the scanning.

In 2026, reports emerged that Anthropic was purchasing books in bulk from suppliers and second-hand bookstores, including rare and unique books, and subjecting them to the destructive scanning method to train its large language models (LLM) after a court ruled that using such material for LLM training "did not, in and of itself, constitute an infringement of copyright".

==== Unbinding ====
More precise and less destructive than cutting pages is to unbind by hand using suitable tools. This technique has been successfully employed for tens of thousands of pages of archival original paper scanned for the Riazanov Library digital archive project from newspapers and magazines and pamphlets, varying from 50 to 100 years old and more, and often composed of fragile, brittle paper. Although the monetary value for some collectors (and for most sellers of this sort of material) is destroyed by unbinding, it in many cases actually greatly assists preservation of the pages, making them more accessible to researchers and less likely to be damaged when subsequently examined. A disadvantage is that unbound stacks of pages are "fluffed up", and therefore more exposed to oxygen in the air, which may in some cases speed deterioration. This can be addressed by putting weights on the pages after they are unbound, and storage in appropriate containers.

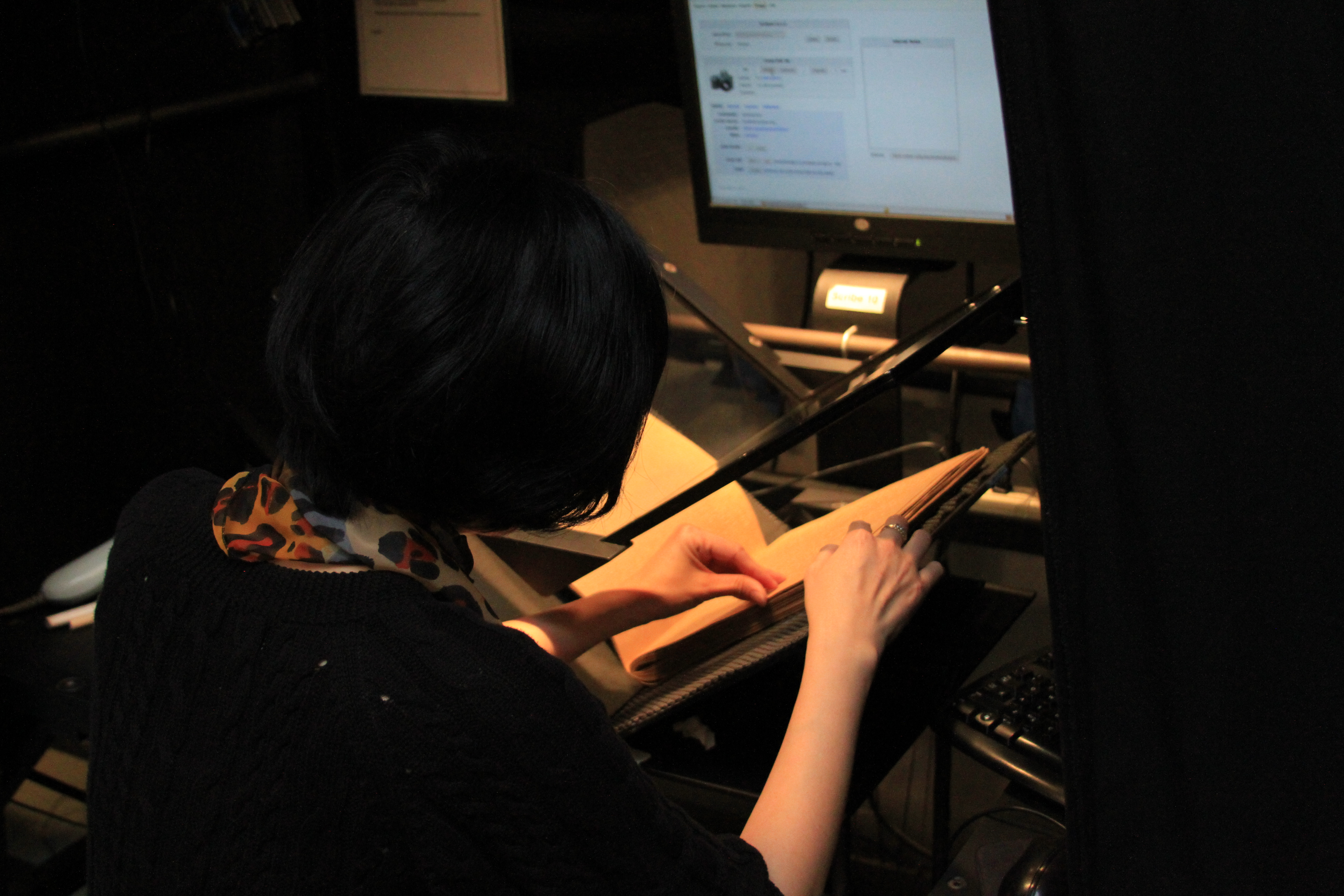
Turning the pages in between taking scans

=== Robotic book scanners ===
Video of the robotic book scanner

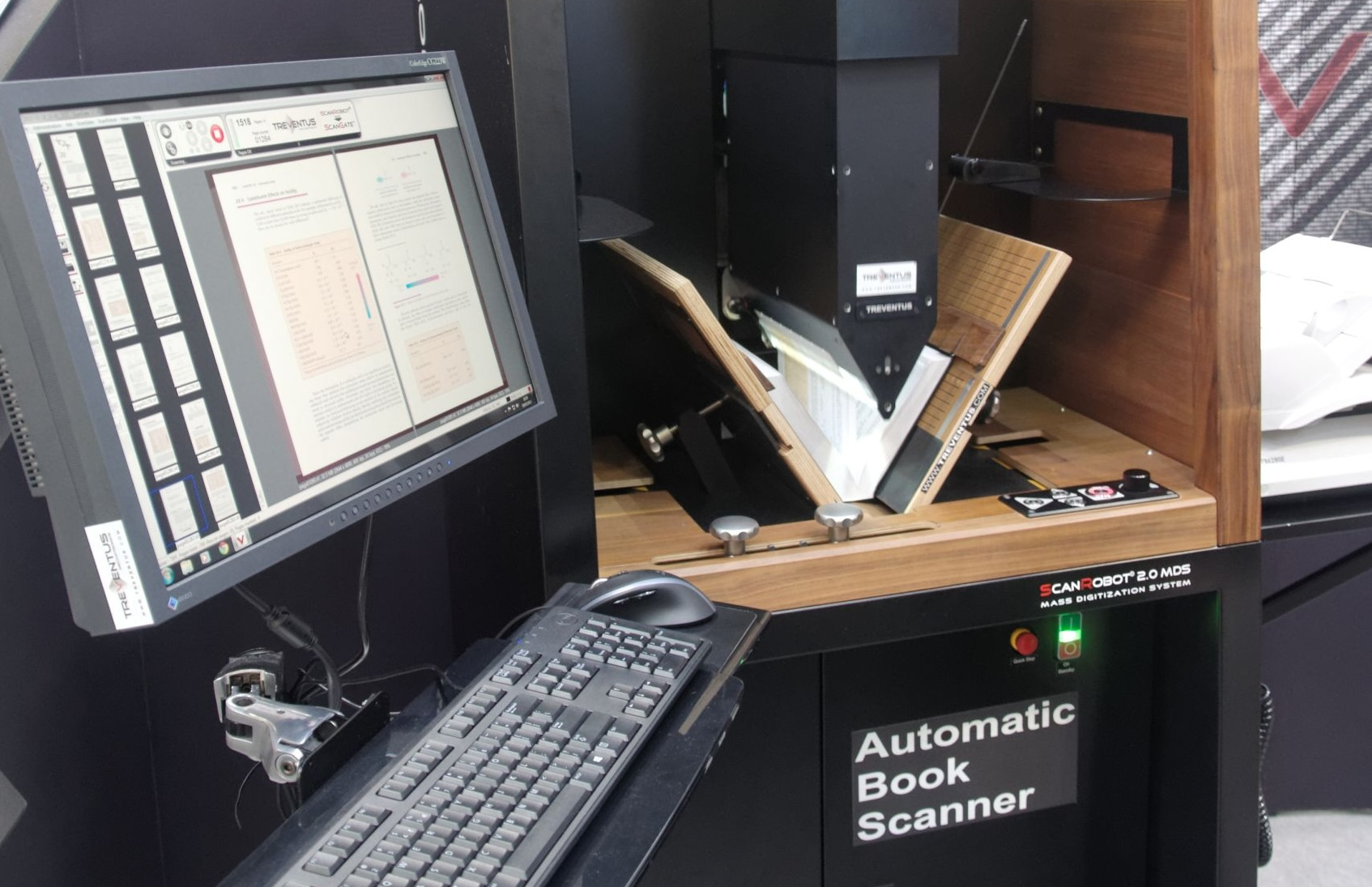
Robotic V-shaped Book Scanner

A robotic or automated book scanner is a device that digitizes printed books by using robotic systems to turn pages and capture images of each page without the need for human hands to touch the book. The scanner consists of a mechanism to automatically turn pages, one or more cameras to photograph each page, and software to compile these images into a digital file. These scanners are used to digitize large quantities of books quickly. Some models allow for manual operation if a book is too delicate or complex for the robot to handle alone. The process is designed to be gentle on books, often using special cradles and glass plates to avoid damage during scanning.

Most high-end commercial robotic scanners use air and suction technology to turn and separate pages. These scanners utilize a vacuum or air suction to gently lift a page from the stack, while a puff of air is used to turn the page over, allowing the device to scan both sides efficiently. Some use newer approaches such as bionic fingers for turning pages. Some scanners take advantage of ultrasonic or photoelectric sensors to detect dual pages and prevent skipping of pages. With reports of machines being able to scan up to 2,900 pages per hour, robotic book scanners are specifically designed for large-scale digitization projects.

Google's patent 7508978 shows an infrared camera technology which allows detection and automatic adjustment of the three-dimensional shape of the page. Robotic book scanners that use air and suction technology rely on specialized systems to turn and separate pages without causing damage to fragile or rare books.

== See also ==
- Digital library
- Institutional repository
- Optical character recognition
- Planetary scanner
- Europeana
