= Global Memory Net =

- Homepage of Global Memory Net (memorynet.net), updated December 12, 2011
- Website type: International education
- Available in: Multilingual
- Owner: United States
- Creator: Ching-chih Chen
- Website: http://memorynet.net/
- Commercial: No
- Launched: July 1, 2006
- Current status: Online

Global Memory Net (GMNet) is a world digital library of cultural, historical, and heritage image collections. It is directed by Ching-chih Chen, Professor Emeritus of Simmons College, Boston, Massachusetts and supported by the National Science Foundation (NSF)'s International Digital Library Program (IDLP). The goal of GMNet is to provide a global collaborative network that provides universal access to educational resources to a worldwide audience. GMNet provides multilingual and multimedia content and retrieval, as well as links directly to major resources, such as OCLC, Internet Archive, Million Book Project, and Google.

== History ==
Global Memory Net superseded Chinese Memory Net (CMNet) , which was founded in 2001 as a NSF/IDLP project. It was intended to make Chinese cultural and heritage resources globally accessible in a multimedia format. "The experiences and knowledge gained from [CMNet] made me realize the need to rethink the model for information dissemination and use," wrote Chen in 2001. CMNet later expanded to represent global collections and officially became Global Memory Net in 2003.

== Collections ==
Reflecting GMNet's origins in CMNet and Prof. Chen's earlier PROJECT EMPEROR-I, an interactive multimedia project , the strongest portion of the collection's content is from China and Asia. This collection includes over 8000 images and featured videos of this World Heritage Site and the original discovery and excavation of the Emperor's terracotta army.

Additional to the Asian collections are materials from around the world. A number of comprehensive collections are included, covering specific sites, cultures, and other overarching themes from content collaborators, including the UNESCO's Memory of the World, Asia Division of Library of Congress, national libraries, academic institutions, and some private groups. These collections feature images of geographical locations and historical sites, historical manuscripts, maps, art, indigenous crafts, weapons, pottery and musical instruments. Every image is accompanied by metadata information. Images of musical instruments are linked with the audio and video files, and with notations. Metadata is recorded in multiple languages. In general, English is provided and is often also available in the local language of the object's country of origin. A recent ongoing project is the multilingual and multimedia documentation of all the UNESCO World Heritage Sites, known as World Heritage Memory Net.

Collections in GMNet are broken up into the following categories to help users browse the extensive content:

- Antique Maps
- Arts, Paintings, Poetry
- Cathedrals, Churches, Shrines, Temples
- Ethnic Groups
- Historical Cities
- Musical Instruments
- National Libraries
- National Memories
- Old Civilizations and Culture
- Palaces- Ancient and Current
- Selected Museums
- UNESCO Memory of the World
- UNESCO World Heritage Sites

In addition, GMNet also includes instant access to over 2530 digital collections from over 80 countries in the world in its World Digital Collections.

== Usage ==
=== Search Methods ===
When one enters GMNet, all collections can be searched using an open search box, which allows traditional search by metadata fields (such as title, date, location, keyword, source, etc.) in multiple languages. Advanced Search with additional Boolean Operators is available for both Collections and images by language and by multiple fields.

Information in GMNet is retrieved not only by the traditional way of searching by collection listings, country, or timeline, but especially by enhanced search methods including freely browsing, randomly looking for images of interest, finding similar images, zooming for details, and obtaining appropriate annotations.

GMNet's search capabilities include:

- Content-based image retrieval (CBIR): This is one of the key features of Global Memory Net.

A user can gain familiarity with an unknown collection through CBIR using Random and Browse image searches, which allow users to browse the collections without requiring knowledge of the language used to describe the records. Randomizing allows users to view a randomized overview of thumbnail images for a collection; users can then follow their visual or contextual interests and narrow their focus if they wish by using the Similar, Larger, and Info functions. Similar retrieves images of the same color and shape, and uses the CBIR developed by Prof. James Z. Wang at Penn State University, but modified in-house . Users can enlarge the thumbnail images (magnification varies with resolution) and also obtain additional descriptive information, including multilingual, multimedia and links where available.

- Traditional Search:

When one has some knowledge of a given collection or of specific information that they are seeking within that collection, a search box allows traditional search by metadata fields (such as title, date, location, keyword, source, etc.) in multiple languages.

- Geographical Search:

Collections are also accessible through a navigation bar link to a listing by country, leading to multiple browsable images and information.

- Temporal Search:

All Collections are listed on a sliding timeline which links to individual Collection pages with information and browsable images. Users can scroll through the centuries viewing all relevant Sites Collections related to the time period of interest.

=== Linked Data ===
GMNet links to outside data sources to provide more additional information resources to the user. These resources include OCLC, Internet Archive, Million Books, Google Scholar and Google Books, Wikipedia, and Flickr.

=== Projects ===
Registered users may create up to 3 projects and save images in a durable portfolio within GMNet. As users search through the collections they can save and add notes and metadata to individual objects.

== Partners ==
GMNet's partners can be divided into two categories:

=== Technology partners ===
- Howard D.Wactlar, School of Computer Science, Carnegie Mellon University, Pittsburgh, Pennsylvania, U.S.
- James Z.Wang, College of Information Sciences and Technology, Pennsylvania State University, University Park, Pennsylvania, U.S.
- Jian-bo Shi, School of Computer Science, University of Pennsylvania, Philadelphia, Pennsylvania, U.S.
- Von-Wun Soo, Chen-Yu Lee, Chao-Chun Yeh, Department of computer science, National Tsing Hua University, Taiwan
- Piero Baglioni, Rodorico Giorgi, Department of Chemistry, University of Florence, Italy
- Takashi Nagatsuka, Tsurumi University, Department of Library, Archival, and Information Studies, Yokohama, Japan

=== Content partners ===
- Global Memory Net, 2003 on - US Library of Congress, Asian Division; Hainan University, Hainan, China; Shanghai Jiao-Tong U, Shanghai; Sichuan University, Chengdu, China; Tsurumi University, Yokohoma, Japan; University J. J. Strossmayer, Osijek, Croatia; Vietnam Museum of Ethnology, Hanoi, Vietnam, etc.
- Chinese Memory Net, 2000-2002 - Peking University, Beijing; Tsinghua University, Beijing; Shanghai Jiao-Tong University, Shanghai, China; Academia Sinica, Taiwan; National Taiwan University, Taiwan.
- Piero Baglioni, Rodorico Giorgi, Department of Chemistry, University of Florence, Italy

== Related projects ==
- World Heritage Memory Net (WHMNet) Launched on April 29, 2011, WHMnet is a model global digital library of cultural, historical, and heritage collections related to the current 911 World Heritage Sites of 151 countries inscribed by the UNESCO World Heritage Committee.
- National Tsing Hua University Memory Net Launched on April 23, 2011, NTHU Memory Net was developed jointly by NTHU and Global Connection and Collaboration to create an online multimedia and multilingual knowledge base celebrating Tsing Hua's Centennial Anniversary. NTHU Memory Net is based on the same conceptual framework and uses the i-M-C-S system which was developed for GMNet, and enhanced for WHMNet.

== Awards ==
- American Library Association, “LITA names winner of 2006 Kilgour Award”, April 18, 2006, Accessed February 20, 2009.
- Ching-chih Chen receives 2008 Beta Phi Mu Award, March 18, 2008, Accessed May 19, 2011.
