= World Heritage Memory Net =

Internet library for UNESCO

- Homepage of World Heritage Memory Net (whmnet.org), update August 15, 2011
- Website type: International education
- Available in: Multilingual - All 6 official UN languages and additionally up to 103 languages
- Owner: United States
- Creator: Professor Ching-chih Chen
- Website: whmnet.org
- Commercial: No
- Launched: April 29, 2011

World Heritage Memory Net (WHMNet), a partnership project with UNESCO World Heritage Centre, is a global digital library of cultural, historical, and heritage multimedia collections related to the current 962 UNESCO World Heritage Sites of 157 State Parties. Of these 962 sites, 745 are cultural sites, 188 natural, and 29 mixed and 38 of the total 962 are in danger. WHMNet was officially launched April 29, 2011, and can be thought of as “the world’s heritage at your fingertips.”

The guiding conceptual principle for the development of the World Heritage Memory Net is to construct a framework that allows users to easily see, explore, discover, and visually experience the 936 Heritage Sites first, and then dig in for more detailed and descriptive information about each Site, as graphically shown on the home page. It is directed by Ching-chih Chen, currently of Global Connection and Collaboration, a nonprofit and tax-exempt 501(c)(3) organization; prior to July 2010, Chen directed this project for three years at Simmons College until she became Professor Emeritus.

The goal of WHMNet is to provide an online library of material related to the 962 UNESCO World Heritage Sites, and to provide universal access to a worldwide audience. WHMNet provides multimedia and multilingual content and retrieval, videos, timeline, map, as well as links to major resources, such as OCLC, Wikipedia, Internet Archive, Million Books, Google Scholar and Google Books.

All of the collections are available in at least 6 official UN languages: Arabic, Chinese, English, French, Russian and Spanish. As of 2012, up to 103 languages are supported by WHMNet, as available.

== History ==
Directed by Ching-chih Chen of the US nonprofit and tax-exempt 501(c)(3) organization, Global Connection and Collaboration, Inc., and supported until August 2010 by the NSF/International Digital Library Program (IDLP) as a part of her Global Memory Net, WHMNet is the result of a multi-year Memorandum of Understanding (MoU) signed in November 2006 between the World Heritage Centre and Simmons College, Boston, Massachusetts, USA under the leadership of Chen, who was then information technology Professor at Simmons Graduate School of Library and Information Science. The WHMNet project, which began in July 2007, benefits greatly from Chen's GMNet, an online global image library and gateway to cultural, historical, and heritage images around the world, created with a multi-year grant from the International Digital Library Programme of the US National Science Foundation (NSF). WHMNet leverages GMNet's innovative integrated multimedia content retrieval system (i-M-C-S) with further system development. Chen became Professor Emeritus of Simmons College in June, 2010 and NSF grant ended in August 2010. Since September 2010 to the present, WHMNet has been supported by GlobalCC until its completion.

== Collections ==
WHMNet is an online knowledge base which provides universal access to multilingual, multimedia and multiformat resources from museums, archives, libraries, and world bibliographic and Web resources, and includes photographs, videos, 360° Panophotographies, audio clips, and documents. Currently, the WHMNet Collection has more than 40,000 images, 27 video tours, many more video documentaries from available sources, and access to more than 250 360° Panophotographies courtesy of Tito Dupret. Detailed descriptive information is presented in multilingual format in at least 6 UNESCO official languages (Arabic Chinese, English, French, Russian, and Spanish) and in many additional languages when available. In total, 103 world languages are represented.

Multilingual multimedia collections of the 936 UNESCO World Heritage Sites are accessible by:

- Geographical regions - such as Africa, Asia, Europe, etc.
- Within each region by country or areas
- Within each country or area, alphabetically by the name of the World Heritage Site
- Alphabetically by World Heritage Site category: Cultural, Natural, Mixed, In Danger
- Timeline, listing type of site, name of site, and a popup with information, an image, and a link to the main page for that World Heritage Site

In addition to basic demographic information and descriptions, each site page includes a sliding image gallery of up to 75 images, and a link to the main image gallery of up to 250 images per site. Further bibliographic information and still images (photographs) of each site are available for both traditional and content-based image retrieval, and when videos, audio clips as well as 360° Panophotographies are available, they are also provided.

In addition to WHMNet's own image resources and UNESCO/WHC's images (approximately 5% of the total, used with permission), relevant open source images are identified, selected, and provided. These include those from websites such as Wikimedia Commons and Flickr. Video sources from WHC's partner, NHK World Heritage 100 series, are linked, as well as 360° Panophotographies of some sites.

=== Linked Data ===
WHMNet links to outside data sources to provide more additional information resources to the user. These resources include OCLC, Internet Archive, Million Books, Google Scholar and Google Books, Wikipedia, and Flickr.

== WHM Lecture Series ==
WHMNet and GMNet have been widely exposed through numerous invited, keynote and plenary speaking engagements in over a dozen countries. Beginning in January 2011, a specific lecture series has started entitled World Cultural Heritage is One Click Away: Lecture Series. This series of talks has been given in many locations in Taiwan; the National Agricultural Library in Silver Springs, MD; through a Digital Video Conference to the U.S. Embassy in Tashkent, Uzbekistan; ACRL/IRC Convention in Washington, DC; and many others.

== Related Projects ==
• National Tsing Hua University Memory Net (Launched on April 23, 2011, NTHU Memory Net was developed jointly by NTHU and Global Connection and Collaboration to create an online multimedia and multilingual knowledge base celebrating Tsing Hua's Centennial Anniversary. NTHU Memory Net is based on the same conceptual framework and uses the i-M-C-S system which was developed for GMNet, and enhanced for WHMNet.

• Global Memory Net (World Heritage Memory Net's system is modified and expanded from that of GMNet)

• PROJECT EMPEROR-I (1985–1994)
