= Ching-chih Chen =

- 陳劉欽智
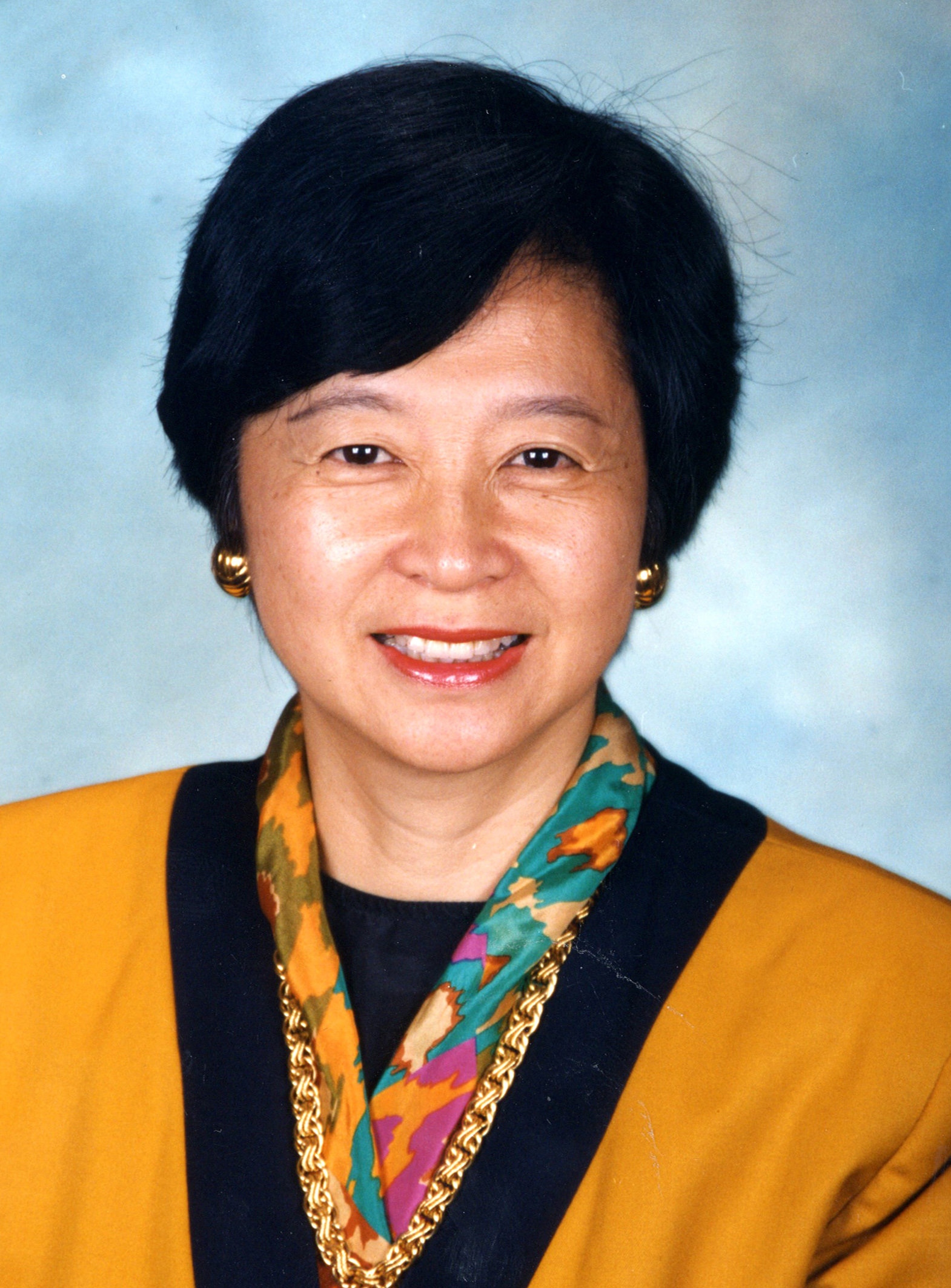
- Born: 1937 (age 88–89); Gulangyu Island, Fukien, China
- Citizenship: United States
- Education: National Taiwan University (BA); University of Michigan (MLIS); Case Western Reserve University (PhD)
- Known for: digital technology projects in the fields of Digital Library/Archive and Museum Development
- Spouse: Sow-Hsin Chen
- Awards: American Library Association - Beta Phi Mu Award (2008); Library Information Technology Association/OCLC Kilgour Award (2006)

Ching-chih Chen
- Traditional Chinese: 陳劉欽智
- Simplified Chinese: 陈刘钦智
Transcriptions
Standard Mandarin
- Hanyu Pinyin: Chén liúqīnzhì
Yue: Cantonese
- Jyutping: Can4 Lau4jam1zi3
Southern Min
- Hokkien POJ: Tân Lâu-khim-tì

Ching-chih Chen (Traditional Chinese: 陳劉欽智; born 1937) is a Taiwanese-American information scientist. She is a professor emeritus at Simmons College since June 2010, and president of Global Connection and Collaboration, Inc., a non-profit tax-exempt 501(c)(3) organization.

== Early life and education ==
Ching-chih Chen was born in Gulangyu Island, Fukien Province, on the southeastern coast of China, to a family that prioritized education. Her father was an economics professor who died when Chen was a young child. She moved with her mother to Taiwan in 1949 shortly before the Communist takeover of the mainland where she completed her elementary and secondary schooling.

As a Rotary Scholar, she attended National Taiwan University, where she received a B.A. degree in foreign literature and language in 1959. As a Barbour Scholar, Chen went on to receive an M.L.I.S. from the University of Michigan in 1961. After graduation she worked as a librarian on campus and took undergraduate classes in mathematics. She received a Ph.D. in information science from Case Western Reserve University in 1974 with the late Prof. Philip M. Morse of MIT as her Ph.D. Supervisor on operations research with data from the Countway Library of Medicine of Harvard University.

== Administrative and academic career ==
Prior to July 1971, Chen held administrative positions at various organizations, including the University of Michigan, head of Science Library at McMaster University (1963–64), head of Engineering, Mathematics and Science Library at University of Waterloo (1965–1968), and associate head librarian at MIT Science Library (1968–1971).

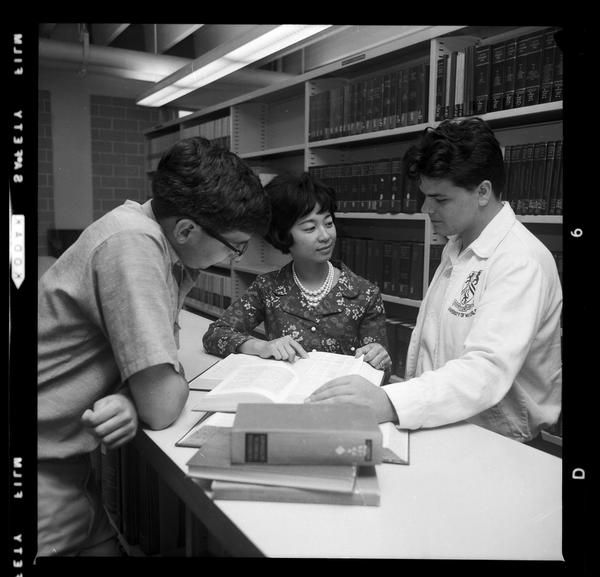
Ching-chih Chen standing in front of open book, assisting students in University of Waterloo library stacks.

Chen moved to Canada in the summer of 1962. After working briefly at the Windsor Public Library she accepted a position at the McMaster University Library as a reference librarian and, within six months, was promoted to the head of the engineering and science library. In September 1964 Chen started work as a senior reference librarian at the University of Waterloo. In July 1965, after holding an appointment as the supervising librarian, Chen was named head of the engineering, science and math library.

She joined Simmons College Graduate School of Library and Information Science as an assistant professor in 1971 and retired in June 2010, after a 39-year teaching and research career. She was full professor from 1979 to 2010, and also associate dean of the Graduate School of Library and Information Science from 1979 to 1998.

Her focus throughout her academic career was in the areas of information management, new information technology applications, and international librarianship. Since 1985 her focus has been digital humanities, optical technology, digital media, multimedia technologies, and web-based development related to global digital libraries, archives, and museums.

Between 1980 and 2010, she offered more than 60 continuing education institutes at Simmons College and about 50 globally in more than two dozen countries, including Australia, Austria, Canada, China, Croatia, Cuba, Finland, Germany, India, Israel, Malaysia, Philippines, Singapore, Spain, Sweden, Thailand, and UK

Chen's interdisciplinary career attracted collaborators from many subject areas, including computer science, photography, chemistry, art, and humanities.

=== The First Emperor of China ===
Since the mid-1980s, Chen's research has focused on developing multimedia applications for educational purposes. Her work includes the production of the award-winning interactive multimedia videodisc (1985) and multimedia CD (1991) by the Voyager Company, entitled The First Emperor of China (Qin Shi Huang Di (秦始皇帝)), supported by the U.S. National Endowment for the Humanities (NEH) as part of her project entitled PROJECT EMPEROR-I. The videodisc and CD provide interactive access to images, videos and descriptive information about the 7,000 lifesize figures of terra cotta warriors and horses found in the archeological excavations near Xi'an, China, in March 1974. The First Emperor of China CD was voted one of the 50 Best CD-ROMS by MacUser in 1979.

Chen's Project was written up by authors in various computer and videography publications including Multimedia Solutions, Computerworld Special Report, and in Library and Humanities Literature such as the Library of Congress Gazette, Visual Resources, and Library Journal. It was the lead cover article in Academic Computing in March, 1989. In 1992, The Chronicle of Higher Education highlighted her work in their Information Technology Section.

The First Emperor of China was one of three university projects selected for inclusion in Sun MicroSystems’ brochure for worldwide distribution to higher education and research institutions. It was also chosen for debut presentation at the TECH 2000 Preview Reception at the new TechWorld Plaza, Washington D.C. in 1990, in the company of Robert Abel's multimedia version of Picasso's Guernica, National Geographic Society's "GTV," "Ice Run," and "Mandala Systems;" and it was included in a Museum Exhibit at The Cleveland Museum of Art, Cleveland, Ohio.

The Visual Almanac (a videodisc with a set of 20 floppy disks with HyperCard programs) produced by the Multimedia Group of Apple Computer, Inc. includes contributions from PROJECT EMPEROR-I. PROJECT EMPEROR-I has also contributed to the CD-ROM and Videodisc Samplers for Higher Education, produced by Apple Computer, Inc. in the beginning of 1990.

=== Information Technology Advisory Committee ===
With an Executive Order, Chen was appointed by President Clinton in February 1997 to serve as a member of the U.S. President's Information Technology Advisory Committee (PITAC). As a PITAC member serving under both Presidents Clinton and Bush between 1997 and December 2002, she co-chaired the PITAC Subcommittee on International Issues, and was a member of the PITAC Subcommittees on Next Generation Internet (NGI) and IT*2 Initiative Review; and Panels on Digital Divide, Digital Library, Learning of the Future, Individual Security, and others. She also chaired the PITAC's activity on Digital Divide for Smaller Institutions.

=== Digital Library Development ===
Chen's work in multimedia led her to work toward developing global digital knowledge bases and digital global information sharing. As early as 1993, she introduced her global digital library concept as the central theme of her keynote speech in Taipei, Taiwan at the International Conference on National Libraries – Towards the 21st Century. Chen's PITAC involvement led her to work toward universal access of digital information, and she collaborated from 2001 to 2008 with the co-chair of PITAC, Prof. Raj Reddy of Carnegie Mellon University, as the Co-Principal Investigator of the China-US Million Book Project which he initiated.

Chen made her proposal to the National Science Foundation (NSF) / International Digital Library Projects (IDLP) in 2001, and has led two major NSF Projects since then: (1) Global Memory Net and (2) International Collaboration to Advance User-oriented Technologies for Managing and Distributing Images in Digital Libraries.

Global Memory Net, launched for public access in July 2007, is a global image digital library and gateway to the world's cultural, historical, and heritage multimedia resources, with collaborators from different parts of the world. The system for this project was modified and enhanced for the development of World Heritage Memory Net in partnership with UNESCO World Heritage Centre (WHC), which provides instant multimedia and multilingual access to all World Heritage Sites inscribed by UNESCO WHC.

=== American Library Association ===
Throughout the years, Chen has been active in professional associations such as The American Library Association (ALA), Library Information Technology Association (LITA), American Society for Information Science and Technology (ASIS&T), and the Association for Library and Information Science Education (ALISE). In 1995, Chen became the first Asian American formally nominated by the American Library Association as a presidential candidate, and was named by Avenue Asia as one of the “500 Most Influential Asian Americans in the US.”

== Conferences ==
Chen initiated a series of 12 International Conferences on New Information Technology (NIT) from 1987 to 2001 in different parts of the world (Bangkok, Thailand 1987; Singapore 1989; Guadalajara, Mexico 1990; Budapest, Hungary 1991; Hong Kong 1992; Puerto Rico 1993; Alexandria, VA, US, 1994; Riga, Latvia 1995; Pretoria, South Africa 1996; Hanoi, Vietnam 1998; Taipei, Taiwan 1999; Beijing, China 2001. Papers and discussions from these meetings were all formally published as proceedings or books. The outcome of NIT '99 (Taipei) and NIT'2001 (Beijing) are the two-volume books related to the development of Global Digital Libraries – IT and Global Digital Library Development (1999) and Global Digital Library Development in the New Millennium: Fertile Ground for Distributed Cross-Disciplinary Collaboration (2001).

Chen was co-Chair of the 4th ACM/IEEE Joint Conference on Digital Libraries (JCDL) held in Tucson, Arizona in June 2004. She was on the advisory committee of DELOS Network of Excellence on Digital Libraries from 2002 to 2004, and served as US co-chair of the NSF/DELOS Work Group in Digital Imagery for Significant Cultural, Historical and Heritage Materials from 2001 to 2004.

== Personal life ==
Chen met Dr. Sow-Hsin Chen in 1959 while both were studying at the University of Michigan. They married in 1961 and moved to Canada the following summer where Chen worked briefly at the Windsor Public Library while her husband completed his doctorate at McMaster University before taking a position at the McMaster University Library. Together they raised two daughters and one son.

== Awards and honors ==
Ching-chih Chen is a recipient of over forty awards since 1970. Among those are:

2008 – American Library Association Beta Phi Mu Award

2006 – LITA/OCLC Kilgour Award

2001 - American Association for Higher Education's Ernest A. Lynton Award for Faculty Professional Service

1997 - ALISE-Pratt/Severn National Faculty Award (first)

1996 – American Library Association Humphry/OCLC/Forest Press Award on International Achievement

1994 – Library Information Technology Association (LITA)/Library High Tech Award

1992 - Silver Medal of CINDY Award of the Association of Visual Communicators, for Voyager's version of The First Emperor of China videodisc

1990 - LITA/Gaylord Award for Achievement in Library and Information Technology

1985 - Fellow of the American Association for the Advancement of Science (AAAS)

Chen is the recipient of Distinguished Alumni Awards from her three Alma Maters (National Taiwan University, University of Michigan, Case Western Reserve), and has served as an Honorary Professor of several universities, including Tsinghua University and Hainan University, China.

== Works cited ==
- Chen, Ching-chih. Applications of Operations Research Models to Libraries. School of Library Science, Case Western Reserve University, September, 1974.
- Liu, Menqxiong. The History and Status of Chinese Americans in Librarianship. Summer, 2000.
- The Impact of Technology on Asian, African, and Middle Eastern Library Collections, edited by R. N. Sharma. Lanham, MD: The Scarecrow Press, 2006.
- Women of Color in Librarianship: An Oral History, ed. by Kathleen de la Pena McCook. Chicago, IL: American Library Association, 1999.
- Lee, Hwa-Wei, "Ching-chih Chen: A Shining Star and Model of Chinese American Library and Information Science Professionals,” Bridging Cultures: Chinese American Librarians and their Organizations: A glance at the thirty years of CALA 1973–2003, Zhijia Shen, Liana, Hong Zhou, and Karen T. Wei, eds. Guilin, China: Guangxi Normal University Press, 2004. p. 9-25.
