= Sons and Daughters (1974 TV series) =

American television series

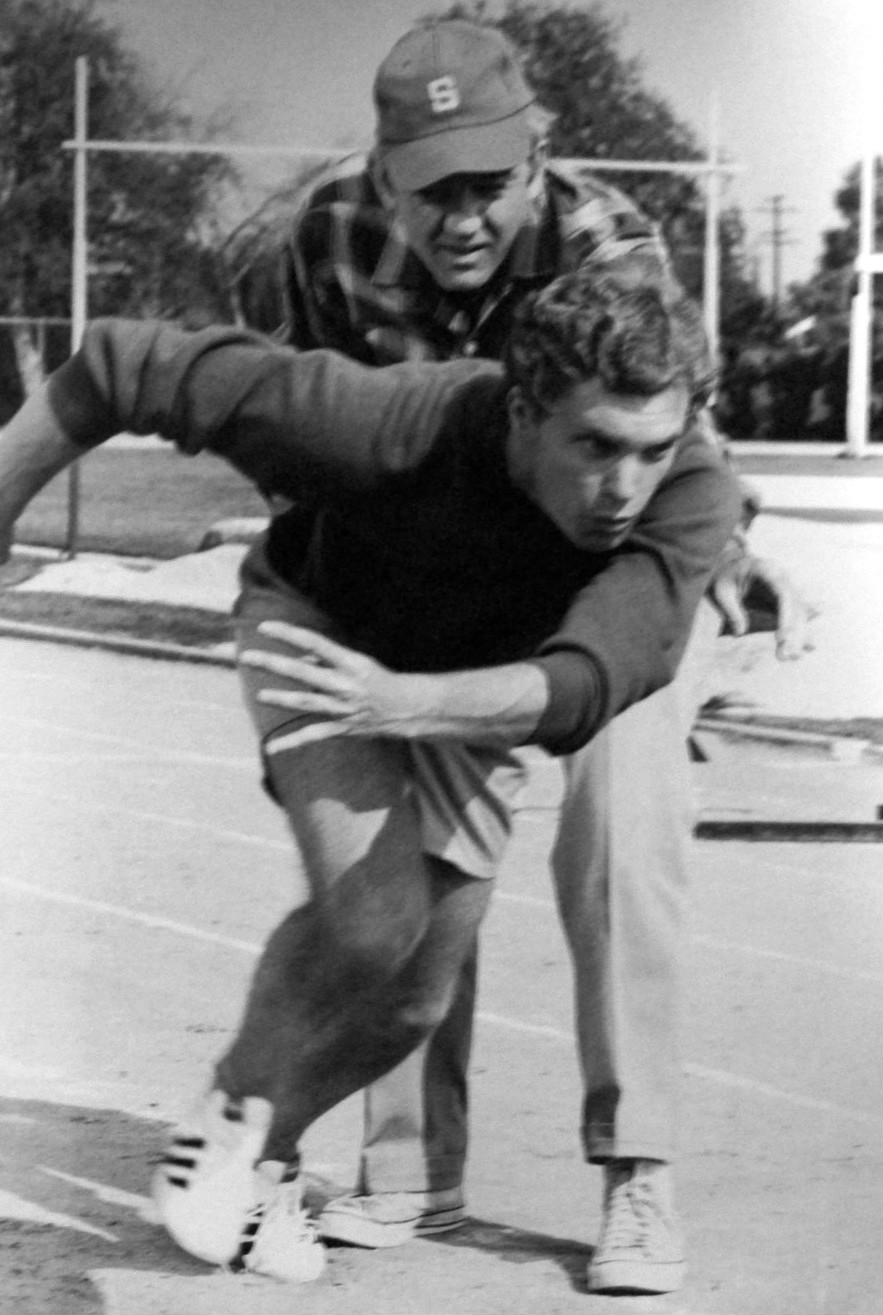
- Gary Frank as Jeff Reed and his coach played by James Callahan
- Genre: Drama
- Starring: Gary Frank; Glynnis O'Connor; John S. Ragin; Debralee Scott
- Composer: James Di Pasquale
- Country of origin: United States
- Original language: English
- No. of seasons: 1
- No. of episodes: 9

Production
- Running time: 60 minutes
- Production company: Universal Television

Original release
- Network: CBS
- Release: September 11 – November 6, 1974

Sons and Daughters is an American drama series that launched from the pilot television movie titled Senior Year, which aired on CBS from September 11 until November 6, 1974. The show was set in California during the mid-1950s and portrayed the trials of life for two teenagers — Jeff, portrayed by 24-year-old Gary Frank and Anita, played by 17-year-old Glynnis O'Connor. John S. Ragin portrayed Walter Cramer, Anita's divorced father.

== Cast ==
- Gary Frank as Jeff Reed
- Debralee Scott as Evie Martinson
- Barry Livingston as Murray "Moose" Kerner
- Jay W. MacIntosh as Lucille Reed
- John S. Ragin as Walter Cramer
- Glynnis O'Connor as Anita Cramer
- Lionel Johnston as Charlie Riddle
- Jan Shutan as Ruth Cramer
- Scott Colomby as Stanley "Stash" Melnyk

== Episodes ==
No.	Title	Directed by	Written by	Original release date
TV–Movie	"Senior Year"	Richard Donner	M. Charles Cohen	March 22, 1974
1	"The Locket"	Charles S. Dubin	Story by : Joseph Michael Calvelli; Teleplay by : Joseph Michael Calvelli & David Levinson	September 11, 1974
Anita stuns Jeff when she rejects his first declaration of love for her, refusing to tell him why.
2	"The Reputation"	Unknown	Unknown	September 18, 1974
Proud and excited when she is named winner of an award presented annually to the outstanding girl at Southwest High, Anita is crushed when the committee suddenly revokes its decision.
3	"The Runner"	Richard Donner	Story by : Brian McKay; Teleplay by : David Levinson & Brian McKay	September 25, 1974
Still mourning the death of his father, Jeff finally meets someone who is able to restore his zest for life—the track coach.
4	"Lucille's Problem"	Richard Donner	Story by : Richatd DeRoy & Joseph Cavella; Teleplay by : Richard DeRoy	October 2, 1974
Anita is eager to become good friends with Jeff's mother, and both she and Jeff are deeply hurt when Lucille coldly and curtly makes it obvious that she resents Anita.
5	"The Accident"	Lou Antonio	Charles E. Israel	October 9, 1974
Jeff's close friendship with Stash abruptly is transformed when, in a cruel twist of fate, Jeff's mother is seriously injured by a car driven by Stash.
6	"The Rejection"	Michael O'Herlihy	Gail Parent	October 16, 1974
Moose gets up the courage and takes Evie home to meet his folks, only to be forbidden by his father from seeing her again.
7	"The Pregnancy"	Lou Antonio and Charles S. Dubin	Story by : John Sacret Young & Daniel Gregory Browne; Teleplay by : John Sacret Young & Gregory Browne & David Levinson	October 23, 1974
Jeff's former girlfriend stuns him with the news that she's pregnant and pleads for his help.
8	"The Invitation"	Lou Antonio	Story by : Daniel Gregory Browne; Teleplay by : Daniel Gregory Browne & David Levinson	October 30, 1974
Although she militantly has refused to meet Jerry Michaelis, her mother's lover, Anita is trapped into confrontation.
9	"The Tryst"	Jeff Corey	Story by : Barbara Avedon & Barbara Corday; Teleplay by : Barbara Avedon & Barbara Corday and Daniel Gregory Browne	November 6, 1974
Jeff and Anita struggle with the decision about whether or not to have pre-marital sex.
