= The Kobayashi Maru (novel) =

1989 novel by Julia Ecklar

- Cover
- Author: Julia Ecklar
- Language: English
- Genre: Science fiction
- Publisher: Pocket Books
- Publication date: 1 November 1989
- Publication place: United States
- Media type: Print (paperback)
- Pages: 254 (paperback edition)
- ISBN: 0-671-65817-4 (paperback 1st edition)
- OCLC: 20763326
- Preceded by: The Cry of the Onlies
- Followed by: Rules of Engagement

The Kobayashi Maru is a 1989 Star Trek science fiction novel by Julia Ecklar which centers around several characters from The Original Series marooned in space on a disabled shuttlecraft. Its title comes from the unwinnable Starfleet Academy training scenario first introduced in the 1982 movie Star Trek II: The Wrath of Khan.

== Plot summary ==
When communications with the Venkatsen Research Group are lost near the Hohweyn system, the USS Enterprise is sent to investigate. In a system with 47 planets and unstable gravitic anomalies, the transporter is not usable, so Kirk and crew take the shuttle Halley to Hohweyn VII. En route, a stranded gravitic mine damages the shuttle. Communications and navigation are non-responsive, and Kirk and Sulu are seriously injured in the blast. McCoy, in an attempt to pass time, convinces Kirk to tell his story about the Kobayashi Maru.

Kirk explains how, as a young cadet, he spent countless nights studying ships and battles in a futile attempt to outthink the computer managing the scenario, until he finally realized that the only way to win was to "change the rules". On his third attempt, he alters the computer's programming so that the Klingon commander attacking him stands down upon learning that he is up against "Captain James T. Kirk". The Klingons agree to provide Kirk and his crew with an escort to save the stranded freighter. This stratagem impresses Kirk's superiors and becomes the first of the many famous acts of his career.

Chekov's story involves both the Kobayashi Maru and a secondary training exercise on an empty space station. Chekov chooses to sacrifice his ship and destroy the Klingon vessels while evacuating his crew but is criticized for failing to account for the fact that the intense amount of space debris would make any rescue attempt impossible. The secondary exercise involves pitting all the cadets against each other to see who lasts a predetermined time period. Chekov fails the exercise when he decides to pick off all of the other cadets, whom he considers inferior to himself. He is dejected to learn that only Kirk passed the exercise by getting the cadets to work together rather than fight.

Sulu shares memories of his great-grandfather Tetsuo, and about going to Command School for the first time. His first exercise is a simulated Federation meeting where he witnesses his fellow cadets squabble and argue in their roles as various heads of state. When Sulu finds out Tetsuo is discontinuing treatments for a life-ending illness, he refuses to speak to him. Sulu finds out about Tetsuo's death after returning from a field exercise. When he takes the Kobayashi Maru, he chooses not to help the freighter on the grounds that it could be a Klingon trap. His crew argue against the decision but are shamed into silence by a female cadet who agrees to go on a date with Sulu.

Scotty talks about his early years at Command School, and how his love of engineering made learning to be an officer difficult. Upon taking the scenario, Scotty used engineering solutions to destroy ever increasing waves of Klingon cruisers before finally getting overwhelmed. An official review of his performance shows that he used the "Perera Field Theory" to destroy the final wave, which was proven to be mathematically possible (thus acceptable to the computer), but physically impossible (as proven by Scotty). A sympathetic officer arranges for him to be transferred to the Engineering School after pointing out that he does not have the temperament to be a captain.

Having finished their stories, the crew resigns themselves to death after running out of workable solutions. Kirk then comes up with a last-ditch idea: he has Chekov write out coordinates, Scotty fashion a beacon to make the Halley an electromagnetic "black hole" that the Enterprise can detect with its sensors, and Sulu use the last of his strength to pilot the craft until they get within sensor range. Spock, as acting captain, brings them aboard Enterprise. As Sulu is wheeled away by McCoy to the sickbay and Scott sets about salvaging the Halley, Kirk brings up the Kobayashi Maru while Spock is helping him walk to the bridge.

== Continuity ==
According to the author's notes, the story takes place after the events of Star Trek: The Motion Picture.

== Reception ==
Ann-Marie Cahill of BookRiot.com recommended the book as "The Starting Book for Star Trek Novels because it gives us the best character foundations while providing strategic insight to the philosophies of Starfleet Academy itself."
