= Double, Double (Friedman novel) =

1989 novel by Michael Jan Friedman

- Cover
- Author: Michael Jan Friedman
- Language: English
- Genre: Science fiction
- Publisher: Pocket Books
- Publication date: April 1989
- Publication place: United States
- Media type: Print (paperback)
- Pages: 308
- ISBN: 0-671-66130-2 (first edition, paperback)
- OCLC: 19582261
- Preceded by: Vulcan's Glory
- Followed by: The Cry of the Onlies

Double, Double is a science fiction novel by American writer Michael Jan Friedman, part of the Star Trek: The Original Series franchise. The novel briefly appeared on the The New York Times Best Seller list, and was his first work within the Star Trek universe.

== Plot ==
One android has survived the destruction of Roger Korby and his scientific facilities. Seeking revenge on Captain Kirk, the surviving droid fools the USS Hood with a distress signal. The Hood's command crew is soon overtaken by a well-organized ambush and Kirk himself is framed for murder.

Kirk's android double takes over his command position on the Enterprise. The real Kirk must rally the survivors of the Hood and his own crew to prevent his double from using the Enterprise for his own nefarious purposes.

== Development ==
Friedman stated he initially had no interest in writing a Star Trek novel, but when propositioned by his agent in 1986, agreed to. When the manuscript was sent to Paramount Studios for approval, editor Richard Arnold told Friedman that Pavel Chekov would have to be removed from the story due to the character being absent from the setting during the period the novel took place. Friedman, rather than removing the character, instead changed when the novel took place.
