= Vulcan's Glory =

1989 novel by D.C. Fontana

- 2006 40th Anniversary reprint cover
- Author: D.C. Fontana
- Language: English
- Genre: Science fiction
- Publisher: Pocket Books
- Publication date: February 1989
- Publication place: United States
- Media type: Print (paperback)
- Pages: 252 pp
- ISBN: 0-671-65667-8 (first edition, paperback)
- OCLC: 19121739
- LC Class: CPB Box no. 1759 vol. 12
- Preceded by: The Final Nexus
- Followed by: Double, Double

Vulcan's Glory is a Star Trek: The Original Series novel written by D.C. Fontana. Fontana was a writer and producer on the original Star Trek television series and was primarily responsible for writing much of the backstory surrounding Spock's Vulcan heritage. This was the only Star Trek novel written by her to be published in her lifetime.

The story focuses on the crew of the Enterprise while Captain Christopher Pike was in command from the period featured in the pilot episode "The Cage". The characters of Number One and Dr. Philip Boyce (both present in "The Cage") also appear, as does a younger version of future Enterprise chief engineer Montgomery "Scotty" Scott.

== Plot ==
Spock, newly promoted to the rank of lieutenant after completing his service as third officer of the USS Artemis, is assigned to serve as both chief scientist and second officer of the USS Enterprise under Captain Pike. Before he can take up his new posting, he is forced to return to Vulcan, where his parents Sarek and Amanda Grayson confront him for his failure to honor the commitments expected of a Vulcan heir: managing his personal estate and announcing a proposal of marriage to his betrothed, T'Pring. Spock does not love T'Pring, but pays her a "bride price" in accordance with Vulcan custom so that she will not pursue the issue further.

Aboard the Enterprise, Pike and Number One prepare to depart for the planet Areta. The native inhabitants once had a flourishing pre-warp culture, only to be decimated by nuclear warfare between rival political factions. The survivors split into three different groups: the townsmen, who have preserved the only two remaining cities on Areta; the nomads, who occupy the deserts as herders and craftsmen; and the mutants, descended from Aretans stricken by nuclear fallout and regarded by the other groups as savage creatures. Pike is instructed to follow up on a previous mission and convince the townsmen and nomads to establish commercial relations so that they may rebuild their civilization.

En route to Areta, new orders arrive from Starfleet: the Enterprise is to divert to a nearby planetoid, GS391, where Vulcan researchers have pinpointed the wreck of the He-shii, a ship that disappeared centuries earlier while transporting "Vulcan's Glory", an emerald that represents the transition of Vulcans from warriors to scientists. Spock requests that an all-Vulcan team be assigned to find the Glory; among the members he selects is T'Pris, a female veteran officer and widow. They discover that a shuttlecraft carrying the surviving crew of He-shii and the Glory departed for Areta in the hopes of finding a suitable environment to await rescue.

On Areta, the team finds the graves of their compatriots, along with the Glory in a nearby cave. Pike then departs alone to complete his original mission under the assumed identity of "Krees": he discovers that the townsmen and nomads are in an uproar over the abduction of Bardan and Silene, the children of two influential leaders who share a forbidden romance. "Krees" has Spock and two Starfleet personnel join him in disguise as mutants and embark on a rescue effort. They find the missing youths, but also discover that, contrary to what they had previously assumed, the mutants are highly intelligent and have asked Bardan and Silene to serve as emissaries to their people to plead for mutual understanding and peace. Pike and his team depart, assured that Areta's future is secure.

On the Enterprise, geologist Gregory Meadows violates Pike's orders and steals the Glory, hoping to make his name by cataloging it for the Federation. He is subsequently murdered by means of a Vulcan martial arts technique, and Number One, as acting captain, has Dr. Boyce and Security Chief Orloff take the Vulcan crew into custody; however, there is no firm evidence that any of them committed the murder. T'Pris volunteers to help and uncovers the murderer's identity. She is then killed in the same manner as Meadows, and her notes on the case wiped from the ship's computer. Spock is horrified to learn of T'Pris's death, as the two of them had formed a bond and given Spock the chance to break off his engagement to T'Pring.

Meanwhile, Lieutenant (junior grade) Montgomery Scott is recruited by a fellow crewman to set up an illegal still in the engineering bay so the two can profit on the sale of moonshine to their comrades. However, a malfunction in the ship's warp drive contaminates the still with light doses of gamma radiation, resulting in Dr. Boyce's sickbay being inundated with inebriated personnel from all areas of the ship. Chief Engineer Caitlin Barry finds not only the still, but Scott's toolbox. Ignoring her obligation to report Scott for endangering the ship's readiness (effectively ending his career), she instead issues a blanket ban on the production of moonshine and returns Scott's toolbox with a quiet warning to never break the rules in such a manner again.

Spock recovers the missing evidence and identifies T'Pris and Meadows's killer as Security Officer Daniel Reed. Reed escapes to the surface of Areta, with Spock in pursuit. Spock learns that Reed is of Vulcan heritage and is descended from the clan supposedly responsible for finding the Glory. Reed's great-grandmother was dishonored by her clan, and he intends to bring her and the Glory back to Vulcan and expose the clan's "lies" as a measure of revenge. Spock subdues Reed with the help of the mutants and takes him back to the ship. He then explains that Reed is wrong: the Glory he claims is fake is in fact genuine, and his actions were therefore in vain. The Glory is returned to Vulcan, and Pike decides to invite Number One to dinner with him before the Enterprise sets out on another mission.

== Background ==
Pocket Books editor Dave Stern approached Fontana to write a Star Trek novel, and she proposed writing the story of Spock's first mission on the Enterprise, joining a crew led by Captain Christopher Pike. She described the writing of Vulcan's Glory as a pleasant experience, particularly working with Stern.
