= The Trellisane Confrontation =

1984 novel by David Dvorkin

- Cover
- Author: David Dvorkin
- Language: English
- Genre: Science fiction
- Publisher: Pocket Books
- Publication date: February 1984
- Publication place: United States
- Media type: Print (paperback)
- Pages: 189
- ISBN: 0-671-46543-0 (first edition, paperback)
- OCLC: 10445088
- Preceded by: The Wounded Sky
- Followed by: Corona

The Trellisane Confrontation is a science fiction novel by American writer David Dvorkin, part of the Star Trek: The Original Series franchise.

== Plot ==
The planet Trellisane is the breeding ground for a three-way war. Captain Kirk ends up as a passenger on a Klingon warship. Dr. McCoy is stuck with cannibals. The USS Enterprise is surrounded by Romulans and the Neutral Zone is filled with more danger than ever.
