= Bertram Brockhouse =

Canadian physicist, Nobel laureate (1918–2003)

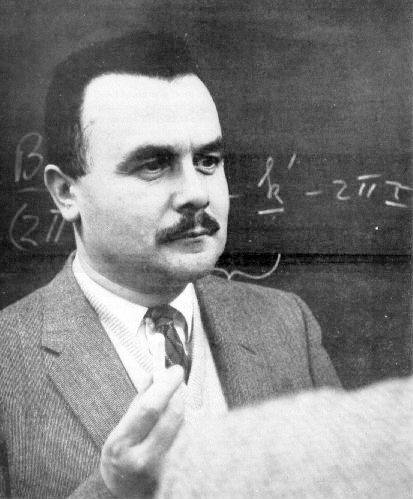
- Brockhouse in front of a blackboard
- Born: Bertram Neville Brockhouse; July 15, 1918; Lethbridge, Alberta, Canada
- Died: October 13, 2003 (aged 85); Hamilton, Ontario, Canada
- Education: University of British Columbia (BA); University of Toronto (MA, PhD)
- Known for: Neutron triple-axis spectrometry
- Awards: Oliver E. Buckley Condensed Matter Prize (1962); Duddell Medal and Prize (1963); FRS (1965); Henry Marshall Tory Medal (1973); Nobel Prize in Physics (1994)
- Scientific career
- Workplaces: McMaster University
- Thesis: The effect of stress and temperature upon the magnetic properties of ferromagnetic materials (1950)
- Doctoral advisor: James Reekie
- Doctoral students: Sow-Hsin Chen
- Website: www.nobelprize.org/nobel_prizes/physics/laureates/1994/brockhouse-bio.html

Bertram Neville Brockhouse, CC FRSC FRS (July 15, 1918 – October 13, 2003) was a Canadian physicist. He was awarded the Nobel Prize in Physics (1994, shared with Clifford Shull) "for pioneering contributions to the development of neutron scattering techniques for studies of condensed matter", in particular "for the development of neutron spectroscopy".

== Early life and education ==
Brockhouse was born in Lethbridge, Alberta, to a family of English descent. He was a graduate of the University of British Columbia (BA, 1947) and the University of Toronto (MA, 1948; Ph.D, 1950).

== Career and research ==
From 1950 to 1962, Brockhouse carried out research at Atomic Energy of Canada's Chalk River Nuclear Laboratory. Here he was joined by P. K. Iyengar, who is treated as the father of India's nuclear program.

In 1962, he became a professor at McMaster University in Canada, where he remained until his retirement in 1984.

Brockhouse died on October 13, 2003, in Hamilton, Ontario, aged 85.

== Awards and honours ==
Brockhouse was elected a Fellow of the Royal Society (FRS) in 1965. In 1982, Brockhouse was made an Officer of the Order of Canada and was promoted to Companion in 1995.

Brockhouse shared the 1994 Nobel Prize in Physics with American Clifford Shull of MIT for developing neutron scattering techniques for studying condensed matter.

In October 2005, as part of the 75th anniversary of McMaster University's establishment in Hamilton, Ontario, a street on the university campus (University Avenue) was renamed to Brockhouse Way in honour of Brockhouse. The town of Deep River, Ontario, has also named a street in his honour.

The Nobel Prize that Bertram Brockhouse won (shared with Clifford Shull) in 1994 was awarded after the longest-ever waiting time (counting from the time when the award-winning research had been carried out-[1958-1994 36 years] ).

In 1999 the Division of Condensed Matter and Materials Physics (DCMMP) and the Canadian Association of Physicists (CAP) created a medal in honour of Brockhouse. The medal is called the Brockhouse Medal and is awarded to recognize and encourage outstanding experimental or theoretical contributions to condensed matter and materials physics. This medal is awarded annually on the basis of outstanding experimental or theoretical contributions to condensed matter physics. An eligible candidate must have performed their research primarily with a Canadian Institution.
