= Memory Prime =

1988 novel by Judith and Garfield Reeves-Stevens

- Cover
- Authors: Judith and Garfield Reeves-Stevens
- Language: English
- Genre: Science fiction
- Publisher: Pocket Books
- Publication date: October 1988
- Publication place: United States
- Media type: Print (Paperback)
- Pages: 320 pp
- ISBN: 0-671-74359-7 (first edition, paperback)
- Preceded by: The Three-Minute Universe
- Followed by: The Final Nexus

Memory Prime is a Star Trek: The Original Series novel written by Judith and Garfield Reeves-Stevens. It was their first work in the Star Trek universe.

== Plot ==
'Memory Prime' is the name of a planet home to artificial intelligences called 'Pathfinders'. These beings help Federation personnel, including Commander Montgomery Scott's old flame, Lt. Mira Romaine, sort the information coming from all over Federation territory. This is intended for the project, Memory Prime, an attempt to undo and avoid a repeat of the fate of the previous archive, Memory Alpha, which was profoundly damaged by malevolent incorporeal beings (in the episode, "The Lights of Zetar"). The planet is also the host to a current series of scientific award ceremonies. Unfortunately the visitors are being stalked by a killer and Spock is being accused of being part of a Vulcan terrorist cell, the Adepts of T'Pel.

== Production ==
The book was written by Judith and Garfield Reeves-Stevens, a married writing couple who had worked together on a series of science and technology textbooks in Canada prior to Memory Prime. They had decided that they no longer wanted to write textbooks. After watching Star Trek IV: The Voyage Home in a cinema in New York they wondered if there were Star Trek novels, and they got in touch with Pocket Books. The duo submitted a series of story ideas, and the publishers selected Memory Prime. The entire correspondence between the authors and the publishers was conducted by post, with no in-person meetings. It was their first work in the Star Trek universe, and they would go on to write behind-the-scenes book, a collaboration with William Shatner and eventually write episodes for Star Trek: Enterprise.

== Reception ==
The novel reached the New York Times Best-Seller list in 1988.

Mary P. Taylor, in her book Star Trek: Adventures in Time and Space, described Memory Prime as "an exciting mystery and satisfyingly complex story with a lot of action and strong character development."
