= The Final Nexus =

1988 novel by Gene DeWeese

- Cover
- Author: Gene DeWeese
- Language: English
- Genre: Science fiction
- Publisher: Pocket Books
- Publication date: 1 December 1988
- Publication place: United States
- Media type: Print (paperback)
- Pages: 282
- ISBN: 0-671-66018-7 (first edition, paperback)
- OCLC: 18885069
- Preceded by: Memory Prime
- Followed by: Vulcan's Glory

The Final Nexus is a 1988 science fiction novel by American writer Gene DeWeese, part of the Star Trek: The Original Series franchise. It was a sequel to the previous book by DeWeese within the franchise, Chain of Attack.

== Plot ==
In The Final Nexus, the warp-gates that the Enterprise have been using to traverse the universe is now malfunctioning. The Enterprise must communicate with creatures from different worlds and universes in an attempt to fix the gates.

== Reception ==
Released in December 1988, The Final Nexus reached #12 on the New York Times bestseller list on December 11, 1988.
