= Jan Shutan =

American actress (1932–2021)

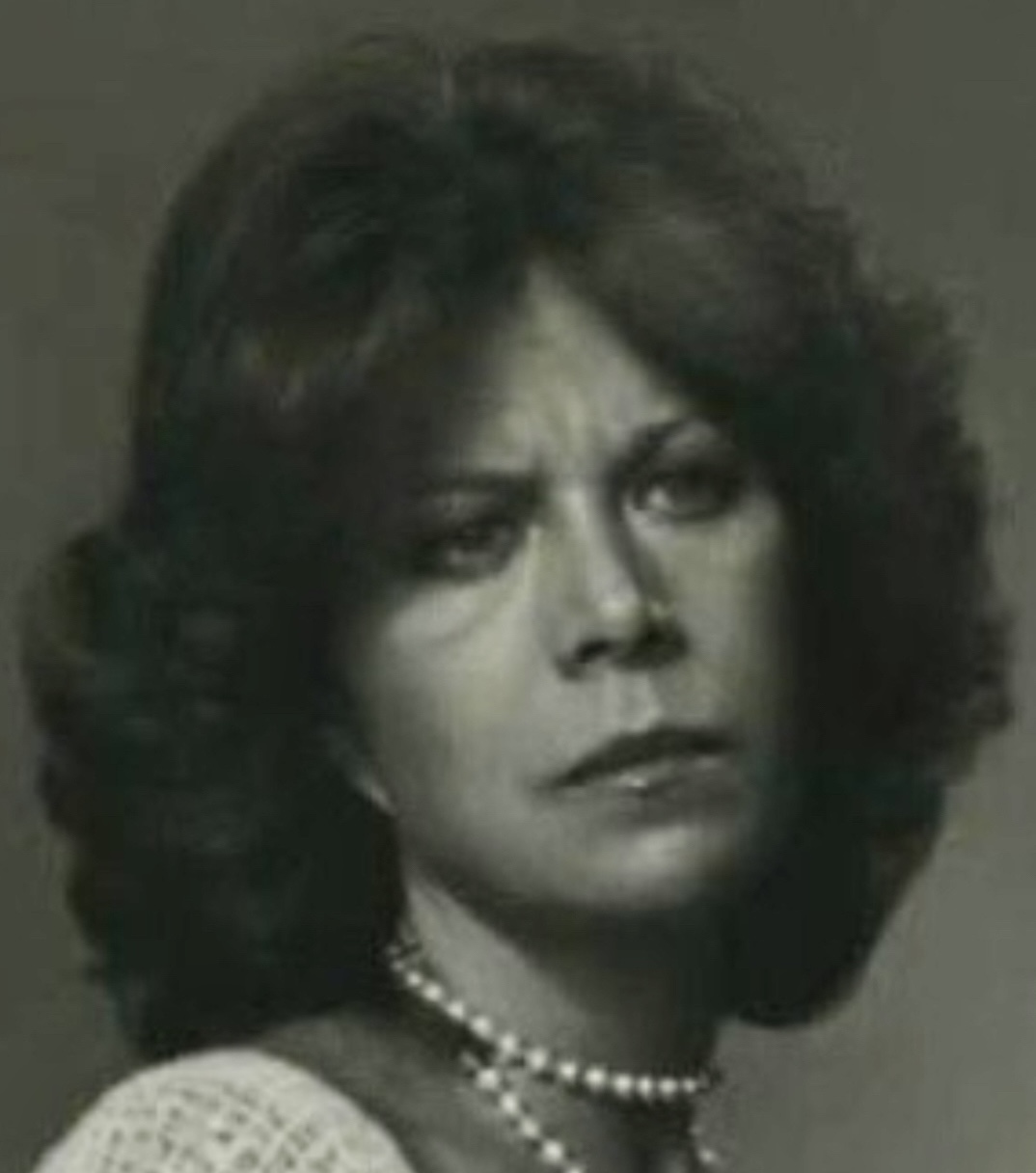
- Jan Shutan in 1979
- Born: Janice Dottenheim; November 5, 1932; Los Angeles, California, U.S.
- Died: October 7, 2021 (aged 88); Beverly Hills, California, U.S.
- Occupation: Actress
- Years active: 1963–1988
- Television: Room 222 (1969–1970); Star Trek: The Original Series (1969); Ben Casey (1963–1966)
- Spouses: Robert H. Shutan (m. 1955; div. 1975) David Levinson (m. 1980; died 2019)
- Children: 2

Jan Shutan Levinson (born Janice Dottenheim; November 5, 1932 – October 7, 2021) was an American actress, best known for her appearance in Star Trek: The Original Series, Sons and Daughters and The Andy Griffith Show.

== Life ==
Shutan was born in Los Angeles, California, to Henry and Shirley Dottenheim, and settled in Beverly Hills. In 1955, she was a winner on the TV program Arthur Godfrey's Talent Scouts as a singer. She married and began to raise a family.

She appeared in TV roles on Ben Casey (as Joanie Shutan/Joanie Cramer) (1963–1966), Bonnie in Room 222 (1969–1970) and Ruth Cramer in Sons and Daughters (1974). She also appeared in The Outer Limits (1964), The Fugitive (1965), FBI (1965), as "cousin" Gloria in The Andy Griffith Show (1965), and as Lt. Mira Romaine in the Star Trek: The Original Series episode "The Lights of Zetar" (1969).

Shutan supplemented her acting on TV programs by making commercials, beginning with one for Tareyton cigarettes. She sometimes appeared in more than 20 in a year, for "everything from cars to soapsuds".

Films she appeared in include Man in the Square Suit (1966), The Seven Minutes (1971), Message to My Daughter (1973), Love Is Not Forever (1974), Dracula's Dog (1978), and This House Possessed (1981).

Shutan died in Beverly Hills on October 7, 2021, at the age of 88.

== Career credits ==
Year	Title	Role	Notes
1963	Arrest and Trial	Receptionist	Episode: Some Weeks are all Mondays
1964	My Three Sons	Florence Proctor	Episode: House for Sale
1963–1966	Ben Casey	Joanie	5 episodes
1964	The Outer Limits	Mrs. Subiron	Episode: The Inheritors: Part II
1965	Barnaby		TV movie
1965	The Andy Griffith Show	Gloria	Episode: Guest in the House
1965	The Fugitive	Lois	Episode: The Old Man Picked a Lemon
1965	Valentine's Day	Barbara Whitfield	2 episodes
1965	The F.B.I.	Sgt. Judy Kessler	Episode: The Exiles
1966	Man in the Square Suit	Marylin Johnson	TV movie
1966	The Felony Squad	Sue Bradley	Episode: A Date with Terror
1967	Dick Tracy	Lizz	TV movie
1969	Star Trek: The Original Series	Lt. Mira Romaine	Episode: The Lights of Zetar
1969–1970	Room 222	Bonnie	8 episodes
1970	Nanny and the Professor	Mrs. Baker	Episode: Star Bright
1971	The Seven Minutes	Anna Lou White	Movie
1971	Night Gallery	Jane Blessington	Episode: Tell David...
1972	Love, American Style	Janet	Love and the President
1973	Message to My Daughter	Lorraine	TV movie
1974	Sons and Daughters	Ruth Cramer	9 episodes
1974	Love Is Not Forever	Ruth Cramer	TV movie (two episodes of TV series Sons and Daughters)
1975	Three for the Road	Susan Aberling	Episode: Match Point
1976	Charlie's Angels	Paula	Lady Killer
1976–1977	Quincy, M.E.	Ginny, Lorraine	2 episodes
1978	Dracula's Dog	Marla Drake	Movie
1978	Mother, Juggs & Speed	Mrs. Barry	TV movie
1979	Hello, Larry	Laura Winslow	Episode: Larry's First Date
1979	Special Treat	Selena Jefries	Episode: I Don't Know Who I Am
1981	This House Possessed	Helen	TV movie
1988	Miracle at Beekman's Place		TV movie
