= The Cry of the Onlies =

1989 novel by Judy Klass

- Cover
- Author: Judy Klass
- Language: English
- Genre: Science fiction
- Publisher: Pocket Books
- Publication date: October 1989
- Publication place: United States
- Media type: Print (Paperback)
- Pages: 336
- ISBN: 0-671-74078-4 (first edition, paperback)
- Preceded by: Double, Double
- Followed by: The Kobayashi Maru

The Cry of the Onlies is a 1989 science fiction novel by American writer Judy Klass, part of the Star Trek: The Original Series saga.

== Plot ==
Boaco Six is caught up in revolution and Captain Kirk is sent in to re-establish diplomatic ties. His efforts are going well until an experimental Federation ship destroys a Boacan vessel. In order to stop a war, Kirk attempts to track down and uncover the secrets of the Federation ship.
