= Corona (novel) =

1984 novel by Greg Bear

- First edition
- Author: Greg Bear
- Cover artist: Boris Vallejo
- Language: English
- Genre: Science fiction
- Publisher: Pocket Books
- Publication date: April 1984
- Publication place: United States
- Media type: Print (paperback)
- Pages: 192 pp
- ISBN: 0-7434-0372-X (first edition, paperback)
- Preceded by: The Trellisane Confrontation
- Followed by: The Final Reflection

Corona is a Star Trek: The Original Series novel written by Greg Bear.

== Plot ==
A sentient force of protostars, called 'Corona', endangers a team of Vulcan scientists. Captain Kirk and the USS Enterprise arrive, their onboard situation complicated by a female reporter and a new computer system that can override Kirk's commands. The situation further degrades when it is learned the protostars might restart the entire universe.

== Reviews ==
- Review by Glenn Reed (1984) in Fantasy Review, September 1984
