= World Digital Library =

International digital library operated by the UNESCO

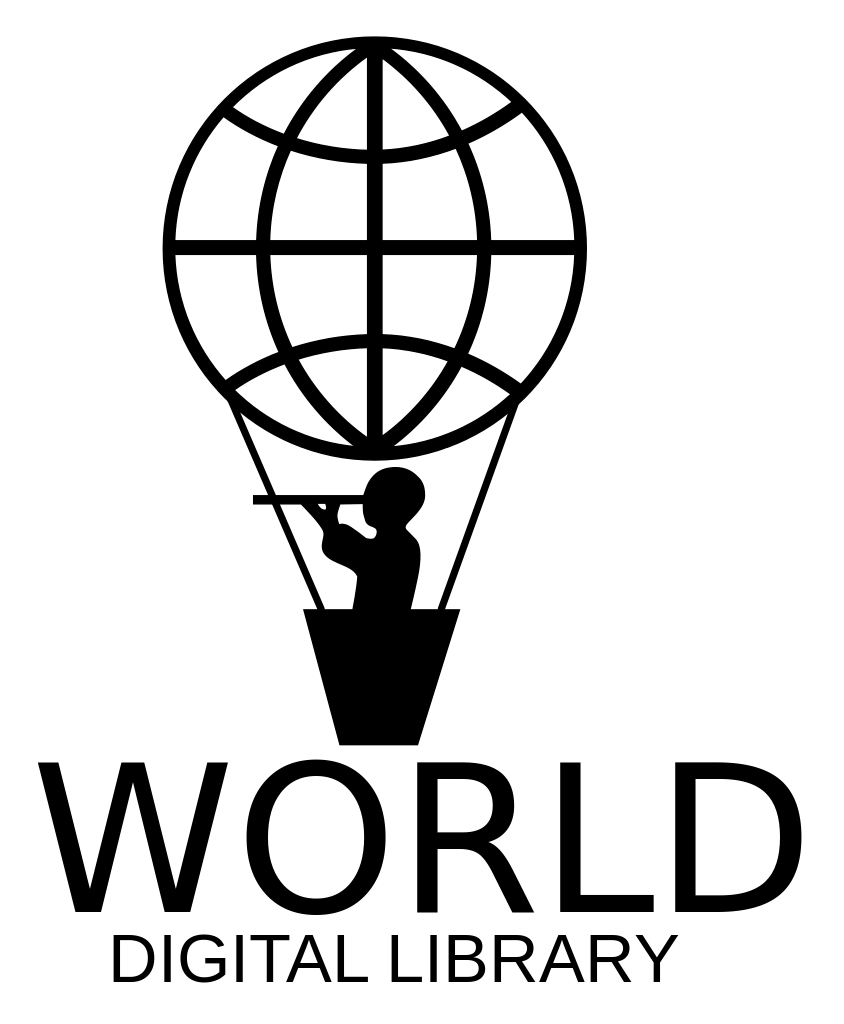

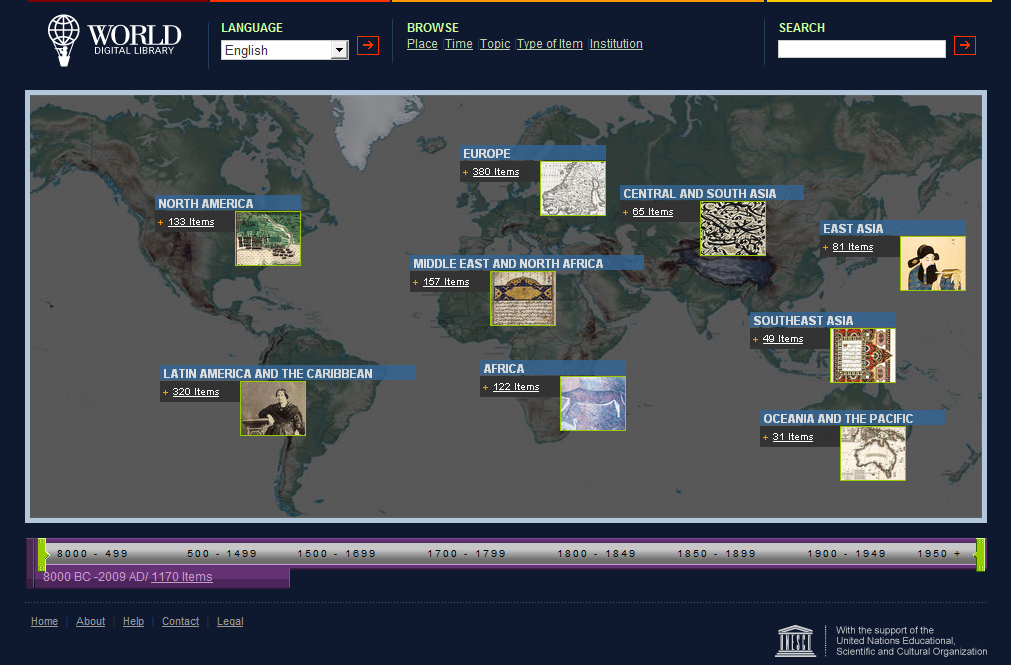
- The WDL homepage on launch day (April 21, 2009)
- Website type: International education
- Available in: Multilingual
- Owner: United States
- Creator: Library of Congress
- Website: www.loc.gov/collections/world-digital-library/
- Commercial: No
- Launched: April 21, 2009
- Current status: Online

The World Digital Library (WDL) is an international digital library originally administered by UNESCO and the United States Library of Congress. It is now maintained by the Library of Congress.

The WDL has stated that its mission is to promote international and intercultural understanding, expand the volume and variety of cultural content on the Internet, provide resources for educators, scholars, and general audiences, and to build capacity in partner institutions to narrow the digital divide within and among countries. It aims to expand non-English and non-western content on the Internet, and contribute to scholarly research. The library intends to make available on the Internet, free of charge and in multilingual format, significant primary materials from cultures around the world, including manuscripts, maps, rare books, musical scores, recordings, films, prints, photographs, architectural drawings, and other significant cultural materials.

The WDL opened with 1,236 items. Over time it grew to include more than 19,000 items from nearly 200 countries, dating back to 8,000 BCE.

== History and concept ==
After almost 20 years without participation, the United States re-established its permanent delegation to the United Nations Educational, Scientific and Cultural Organization (UNESCO) in 2003. James H. Billington, Librarian of Congress, was nominated as a commissioner of the U.S. National Commission to UNESCO and was invited to give a plenary speech at its inaugural conference in June 2005. His speech, entitled A View of the Digital World Library, described a vision in which the rich collections that "institutions, libraries, and museums have preserved could be given back to the world free of charge and in a new form far more universally accessible than any forms that have preceded it."

Google Inc. became the first partner of this public–private partnership and donated $3 million to support development of the World Digital Library in 2005.

Everybody's welcome. This is not a private club. Everybody's welcome to participate and it's all free.

— James H. Billington,
Library of Congress

At the National Commission's 2006 annual conference, John Van Oudenaren, Senior Advisor for the World Digital Library at the Library of Congress, outlined a project plan for bringing Billington's vision to fruition. Foremost was the belief that the World Digital Library should engage partners in planning the four main project areas: technical architecture, selection, governance, and funding. This was achieved in December 2006, when 45 national library directors, library technical directors, and cultural and educational representatives from UNESCO met in Paris to discuss the development of the World Digital Library. The participants formed working groups to address the special challenges of each of the four project areas.

The working groups met in the first half of 2007 and included professionals in the field of digital libraries – including computer science, library and information science, Web development, and fundraising. The working groups presented their findings to the larger WDL group in July 2007. Findings from this planning process were presented at the thirty-fourth session of the UNESCO General Conference in October 2007 in Paris, France.

In early September 2008, the Organization of American States (OAS) agreed to join with the Library of Congress in developing the World Digital Library. Secretary General José Miguel Insulza signed the "Contributor Agreement" with Librarian of Congress, James Billington, at an OAS headquarters ceremony.

The World Digital Library was launched on April 21, 2009, at UNESCO headquarters in Paris, France.

In 2020, the WDL Charter concluded. In 2021, the Library of Congress migrated WDL’s collection to its main website, and archived the wdl.org site. As of December 2025, the wdl.org domain redirects to a collection at the Library of Congress that appears to be static.

== Exhibits ==
These are really great treasures, not merely miscellaneous things about a country or culture.

— James H. Billington,
Library of Congress

Initial exhibits include

- The Tale of Genji, an 11th-century Japanese tale considered by some to be the first novel ever written;
- ancient Arabic texts that were used in the formation of algebra; Chinese oracle bone script;
- Ming dynasty copies of the Yongle Encyclopedia, one of the largest compilations in Chinese literature;
- A printed edition of the Huangdi Neijing dated c. 1115–1234;
- an 8,000-year-old African painting of bleeding antelopes;
- the Waldseemüller map, the earliest map to mention America by name;
- the Codex Gigas; Samuel de Champlain's Des Sauvages: ou voyage de Samuel Champlain, de Brouages, faite en la France nouvelle l'an 1603;
- an audio recording of a 101-year-old former American slave, whose grandparents were owned by Thomas Jefferson;
- the first Aztec mention of the child Jesus;
- World War I recruitment posters;
- an 1899 Canadian government handbook for Scandinavian immigrants;
- Doctrina Christiana, en lengua española y tagala, the first Spanish and Tagalog book ever published;
- an Aleutian translation of the Bible by a Russian saint; Islamic manuscripts from Mali; Hyakumanto Darani;
- rare photographs originating in Imperial China, the Ottoman Empire, and the Russian Empire;
- the first recording of "La Marseillaise;"
- the world's first film from the Lumiere brothers; a photolithographic reproduction of the Constitution of India;
- calligraphy by Prem Behari Narain Raizada; the Huexotzinco Codex;
- and the Nuremberg Chronicle.

== Partners ==
Partners in the World Digital Library project include:

- American Geographical Society Library, UW Milwaukee
- Bibliotheca Alexandrina
- Brown University Library
- Center for the Study of the History of Mexico
- Columbus Memorial Library
- Danish Royal Library
- Egyptian National Library and Archives
- Instituto Nacional de Antropología e Historia
- International Federation of Library Associations and Institutions
- Iraq National Library and Archive
- John Carter Brown Library
- King Abdullah University of Science and Technology
- Library Company of Philadelphia
- Library of Congress
- Mamma Haidara Commemorative Library
- National Archives and Records Administration
- National Central Library
- National Diet Library
- National Library of Azerbaijan
- National Library of Brazil

- National Library of China
- National Library of France
- National Library of Israel
- National Library of Korea
- National Library of Russia
- National Library of Serbia
- National Library of Sweden
- National Library of Uganda
- National Library of Wales
- Qatar National Library, a project of Qatar Foundation
- Royal Netherlands Institute of Southeast Asian and Caribbean Studies
- Russian State Library
- St. Mark Coptic Library
- Tetouan-Asmir Association
- University Library in Bratislava
- University of Pretoria Library
- Vilnius University Library
- Wellcome Library
- Yale University Library
- Yeltsin Presidential Library

== See also ==
- Chinese Text Project
- Digital Public Library of America
- Europeana
- Global Memory Net
- Internet Archive
- National Digital Library Program (NDLP)
- Project Gutenberg
- World Digital Library-Wikimedia partnership
