= John S. Ragin =

American actor (1929–2013)

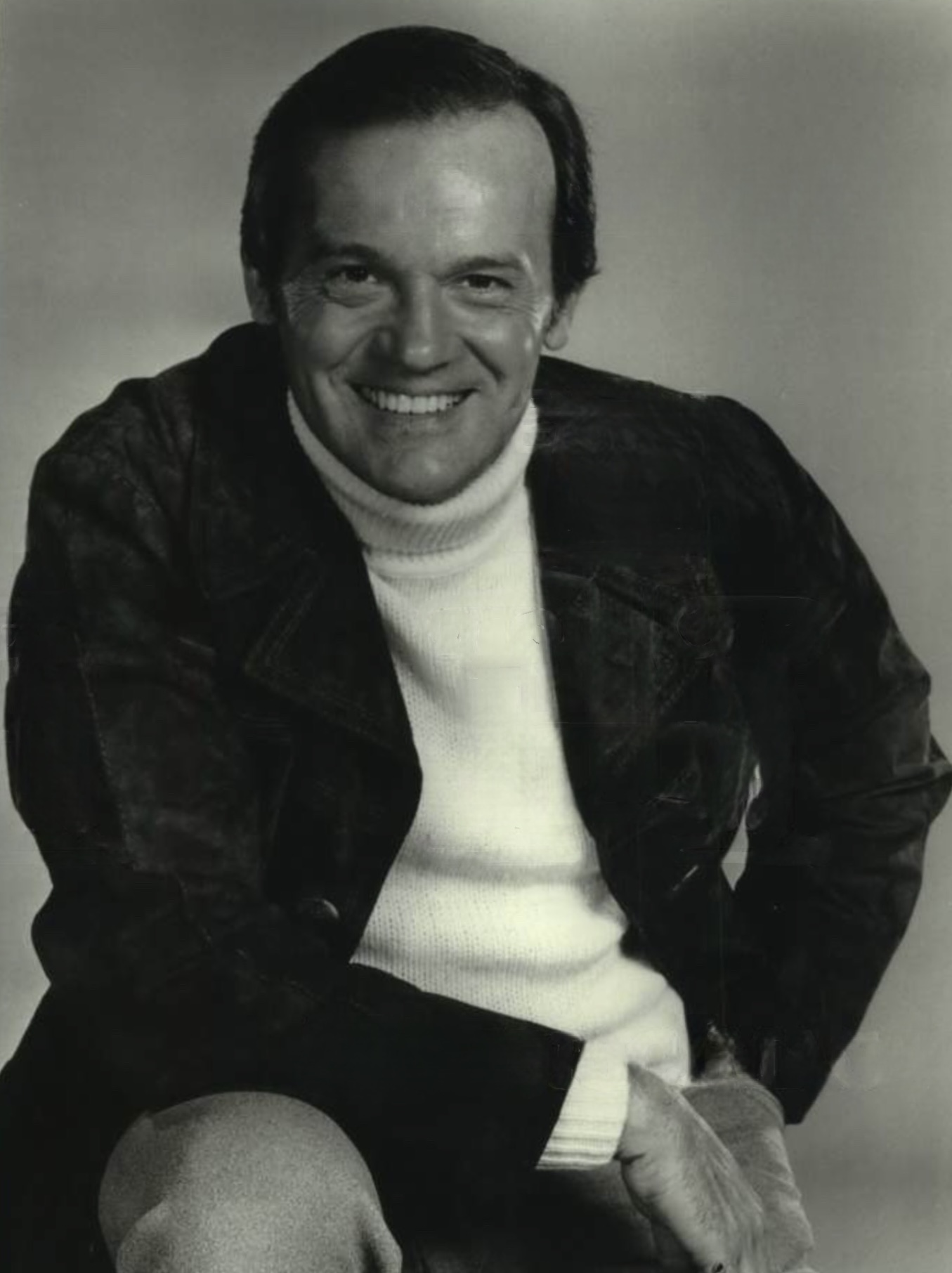
- Ragin in Sons and Daughters (1974)
- Born: John Stanley Ragin; May 5, 1929; Newark, New Jersey, U.S.
- Died: April 14, 2013 (aged 83); Los Angeles, California, U.S.
- Resting place: Forest Lawn Memorial Park (Glendale)
- Occupation: Actor
- Years active: 1960–1993

John Stanley Ragin (May 5, 1929 - April 14, 2013) was an American television and film actor. He was best known for his role as uptight, bureaucratic Dr. Robert Asten, M.E. in the TV series Quincy, M.E. (1976–83).

== Early years ==
Ragin was born in Newark, New Jersey. He attended Rutgers University on a scholarship but later changed to Carnegie Tech. He studied in Europe with two grants from the Fulbright Program.

== Career ==
Ragin appeared in mostly supporting roles in television series such as Alfred Hitchcock Presents, The Invaders, Cannon, McCloud, Murder, She Wrote and Star Trek: The Next Generation. He also appeared in smaller roles in a few films such as Earthquake, The Parallax View and Doctors' Wives.

Ragin played Walter Cramer in the short-lived 1974 CBS TV series Sons and Daughters. During 1990–91, he appeared briefly as Dr. Grant Jameson on the daytime NBC soap opera Santa Barbara.

== Death ==
Ragin died in Los Angeles on April 14, 2013, at the age of 83. He was interred at Forest Lawn Memorial Park in Glendale, California.

== Filmography ==
=== Films ===
- Doctors' Wives (1971) .... Minister (uncredited)
- Copernicus (1973) .... Narrator (voice)
- The Parallax View (1974) .... Buster Himan
- Earthquake (1974) .... Chief Inspector
- Moving Violation (1976) .... Agent Shank

=== Television work ===
- Alfred Hitchcock Presents (1960) (Season 5 Episode 30: "Insomnia") .... Jack Fletcher
- Armstrong Circle Theatre (1 episode, 1960) .... Pettigrew
- Naked City (1 episode, 1963) .... Mr. Warstein
- Gomer Pyle - U.S.M.C. (1 episode, 1965) .... Lieutenant Swanson
- The F.B.I. (4 episodes, 1966–1974) .... Gary Burgess
- The Felony Squad (4 episodes, 1966–1968) .... Dr. Kern
- Blue Light (2 episodes, 1966) .... Zimmer
- Laredo (1 episode, 1966) .... Karl
- The Invaders (2 episodes, 1967) .... John Finney
- Love on a Rooftop (1 episode, 1967) .... Charlie
- Get Smart (2 episodes, 1968) .... Kendall
- The Wild Wild West (1 episode, 1968) .... Reverend Hastings
- The Outsider (1 episode, 1968) .... Todd Elkins
- Ironside (3 episodes, 1969–1972) .... Congressman Lowery
- The Bold Ones: The New Doctors (2 episodes, 1969–1971) .... Dr. Gomrick
- The Bold Ones: The Lawyers (3 episodes, 1969–1971) .... Arresting Officer
- The Lonely Profession (1969, TV Movie) .... Mr. Sutton, FBI
- Mission: Impossible .... (2 episodes, 1970) .... Pharmacist / Butler
- The Most Deadly Game (1 episode, 1970) .... Biff Porter
- Storefront Lawyers (2 episodes, 1971) .... Spencer Pawling / Attorney
- Powderkeg (1971) .... Muncie - hotel clerk
- Night Gallery (1 episode, 1971) .... 1st Policeman (segment "They're Tearing Down Tim Riley's Bar")
- The Forgotten Man (1971, TV Movie) .... Major Parkman
- Alias Smith and Jones (1 episode, 1971) .... Edward Fielding
- Cool Million (1 episode, 1972) .... Fred Harrison
- Barnaby Jones (2 episodes, 1973–1975) .... Eddie R. Davis
- Mannix (1 episode, 1973) .... Burns
- Sons and Daughters (9 episodes, 1974) .... Walter Cramer
- The Six Million Dollar Man (1 episode, 1974) .... Flight Director
- Cannon (1 episode, 1974) .... Chief Inspector
- Killer Bees (1974, TV Movie) .... Sergeant Jeffreys
- Love Is Not Forever (1974, TV Movie) .... Walter Cramer
- The Rookies (1 episode, 1975) .... Bryan McNeal
- Switch (1 episode, 1975) .... Len Ekhardt
- Delancey Street: The Crisis Within (1975, TV Movie) .... Jeff Donaldson
- Quincy, M.E. (144 episodes, 1976–1983) .... Dr. Robert Astin
- McCloud (1 episode, 1976) .... Mr. Jessup
- Harry O (1 episode, 1976) .... John Wesler
- City of Angels (1 episode, 1976) .... Robert Sand
- The Amazing Howard Hughes (1977, TV Movie) .... McKenna
- The Islander (1978, TV Movie) .... Bishop Hatch
- B.J. and the Bear (1 episode, 1980) .... Dr. Robert Asten
- Emerald Point N.A.S. (1 episode, 1983) .... Admiral Lovell
- Riptide (1 episode, 1986) .... Lewis Gordon
- Murder, She Wrote (1 episode, 1987) .... Dr. Cliff Strayhorn
- Airwolf (1 episode, 1987) .... Dr. Kinsington
- Santa Barbara (unknown episodes, 1990–1991) .... Dr. Grant Jameson
- Star Trek: The Next Generation (1993, episode: "Suspicions") .... Dr. Christopher (final appearance)
