= The Three-Minute Universe =

1988 novel by Barbara Paul

- Author: Barbara Paul
- Language: English
- Series: Star Trek: The Original Series
- Genre: Science fiction
- Publisher: Pocket Books
- Publication date: August 1988
- Publication place: United States
- Media type: Print (paperback)
- Pages: 265
- ISBN: 0-671-65816-6 (first edition, paperback)
- OCLC: 18287546
- LC Class: CPB Box no. 2534 vol. 20
- Preceded by: Timetrap
- Followed by: Memory Prime

The Three-Minute Universe is a science fiction novel by American writer Barbara Paul, part of the Star Trek: The Original Series franchise.

== Plot ==
The Sackers, a race of physically repellent beings, murder almost an entire race to steal a powerful device. This device rips a hole in the fabric of space, bringing in a brand-new universe that threatens the old one.
