= Sow-Hsin Chen =

Taiwanese physicist (1935–2021)

- 陳守信
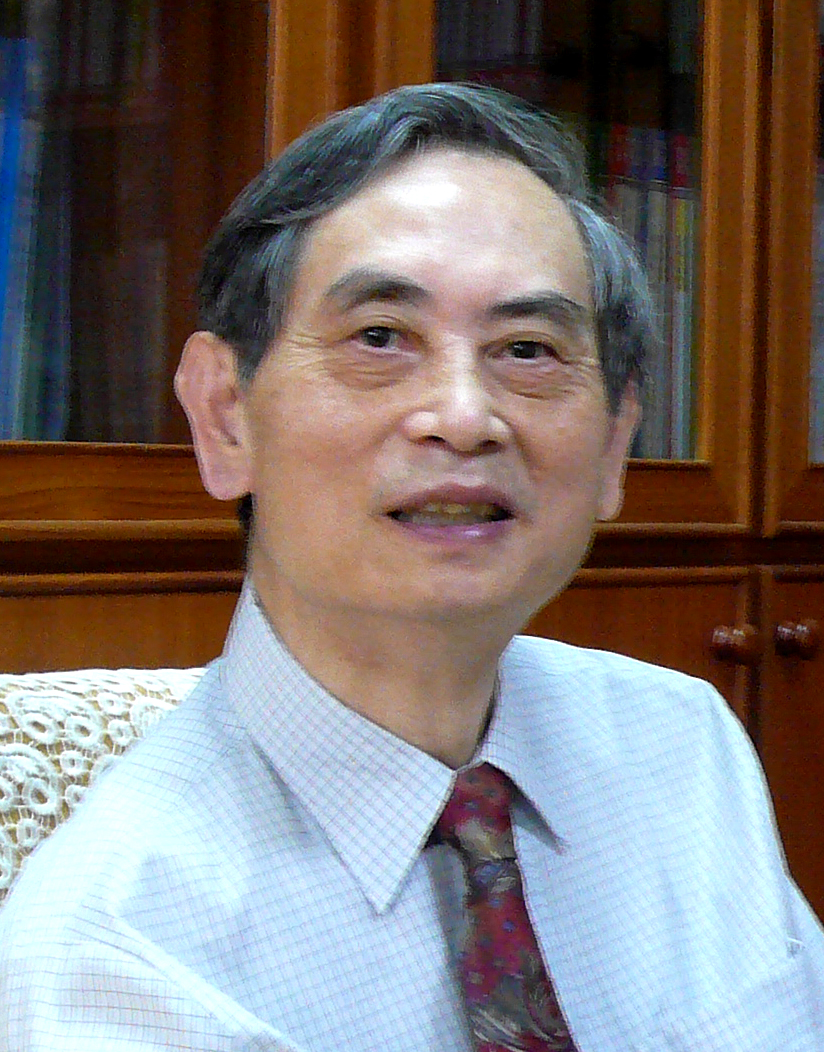
- Born: 1935; Kagi City, Japanese Taiwan
- Died: 26 June 2021 (aged 85–86)
- Education: National Taiwan University (BS); National Tsing Hua University (MS); University of Michigan (MS); McMaster University (PhD)
- Spouse: Ching-chih Chen
- Scientific career
- Fields: Applied physics
- Workplaces: Massachusetts Institute of Technology; Harvard University; Atomic Energy Research Establishment (AERE); University of Waterloo
- Doctoral advisor: Bertram N. Brockhouse
- Other academic advisors: Nicolaas Bloembergen

Sow-Hsin Chen (Chinese: 陳守信; pinyin: Chén shǒuxìn; Pe̍h-ōe-jī: Tân Siú-sìn; 1935 – 26 June 2021), was a Taiwanese physicist and a professor emeritus at the Massachusetts Institute of Technology (MIT). He was a recognized pioneer in the research of the dynamic properties of supercooled and interfacial water with the use of neutron scattering techniques. As an educator, he was recognized for his training of young scientists in the use of those same techniques. Regarding hydrogen storage, his research focused on the use of activated carbon to allow hydrogen to be stored at room temperature.

== Early life and education ==
Chen was born to a Hoklo Taiwanese family. He received his Bachelor of Science (B.S.) in physics from National Taiwan University in 1956, and his Master of Science (M.S.) in physics from National Tsing Hua University in 1958. He then moved to the U.S. with a fellowship from the International Atomic Energy Agency and obtained a M.S. in nuclear science from the University of Michigan in 1962, and his Ph.D. in physics from McMaster University, Canada, in 1964 under the Nobel laureate Bertram N. Brockhouse.

Chen received his postdoctoral training at the Atomic Energy Research Establishment (AERE) in Harwell, U.K. with Professor Peter A. Egelstaff during 1966–1967. Between 1967 and 1968, he was a research fellow at Harvard University with Nobel laureate Nicolaas Bloembergen before joining the MIT faculty in 1968.

== Academic career ==
Chen was promoted to Full Professor of Applied Radiation Physics at the Department of Nuclear Science and Engineering of MIT in 1974. During his tenure, he initiated and taught courses including "Applied Nuclear Physics" for engineers, "Quantum Theory of Interaction of Radiation with Matter," "Statistical Thermodynamics of Complex Liquids," and "Photons and Neutrons Scattering Spectroscopy in Condensed Matter Physics."

== Research and achievements ==
Chen's major research activity was in the use of neutron, x-ray and laser scattering spectroscopy to investigate materials properties of complex fluids and soft condensed matter. His research work included photon correlation spectroscopy studies of the critical dynamics of a binary liquid mixture; neutron scattering studies of the thermodynamics and dynamics of confined water in supercooled states near hydrophilic and hydrophobic surfaces.

Chen contributed significantly to the development of the technique of the Photon Correlation Spectroscopy (PCS). He constructed the first 128-channel digital photon correlator in the U.S. in 1970 and applied it to investigate critical phenomenon in a binary liquid mixture. This type of digital correlator has since become the basic tool for the modern PCS. He applied PCS to studies of dynamic critical phenomena in binary liquid mixtures; the coexistence of critical phenomena and percolation transition in three-component microemulsions and copolymer micellar solutions; and ergodic to non-ergodic transitions when crossing the kinetic glass transition line of a copolymer micellar system with a short-range attraction.

Since 2004, Chen et al. studied liquid state physics with regard to the structure and dynamics of supercooled water. They studied supercooled confined water by a high-resolution Quasielastic neutron scattering (QENS) technique, and this led to the discovery of the likelihood of a second low-temperature critical point in water in 2005. He was reported in Nature as "A physicist ventures into the no-man's land of water to find the source of its unusual properties" Subsequently, one of his peer-reviewed scientific articles received the 2006 PNAS Editorial Board Cozzarelli Award for its outstanding scientific excellence and originality. In 2006, his group discovered a density minimum in deeply supercooled confined water which further demonstrated the plausibility of the existence of the second critical point in supercooled water.

Recently, his work has been highlighted several times in MIT News.

== Other activities ==
Chen was active as an organizer of domestic and over 20 international conferences and symposia as well as the NATO Advanced Study Institutes. He served as chairman of a Gordon Conference on Physics and Chemistry of Water in 1986. He was also active as a consultant to developing countries with regard to their nuclear power development programs. He served as an advisor to the National Science Council and the Institute of Nuclear Energy Research of the Republic of China (ROC), and the Korea Atomic Energy Research Institute (KAERI) of the Republic of Korea on the matter of nuclear power planning and development in the respective countries since 1972. In 2006 and 2008, Chen was the organizer and U.S. Chairman of the first and second Joint Symposia on Neutron Sciences and Technology in China, jointly sponsored by the US National Science Foundation and the Chinese counterpart agencies.

He was a member of numerous national advisory or review committees, including the U.S. National Pulsed Neutron Sources, IPNS/LANSCE at Argonne National Laboratory, the Solid State and Chemical Technology Divisions of Oak Ridge National Laboratory, the U.S. National Science Foundation's Engineering Research Center, the Basic Energy Sciences Division of the Department of Energy, and the Collaborative Instrumentation Block Grant of the National Institutes of Health. Since 2009, he has been a Beamline Advisory Team (BAT) member of National Synchrotron Light Source (NSLS)-II of Brookhaven National Laboratory.

== Personal life ==
Chen met Dr. Ching-chih Chen in 1959 while both were studying at the University of Michigan. They married in 1961 and moved to Canada the following summer where he completed his doctorate at McMaster University. Together they raised two daughters and a son.

== Peer-reviewed publications ==
Chen's publications include over 360 peer-reviewed journal publications and approximately 80 non-journal publications (books, monographs, review articles, and conference proceedings). These coincide with his diversified research interests, which include bulk and confined water, cement hydration kinetics, colloids, critical phenomena, dynamic light scattering, group theory, hydrogen storage materials, neutron and x-ray inelastic scattering, protein dynamics, x-ray and neutron diffraction and reflectivity, and others. He served as a member of the Editorial Board (Liquid Section) of the Journal of Physics: Condensed Matter (JPCM ) (U.K.) from 1992 to 1998, and he was an active guest editor of special issues of JPCM and PHYSICA A.

Beginning in 1995, special scientific meetings were organized every five years to bring together over 100 colleagues, former and current students, and friends to honor Chen for his continuing contributions to the field of soft-matter physics. The scientific presentations from these meetings have been published in peer-reviewed special journal issues in his honor (1995, Puerto Rico; 2000, Messina, Italy; 2005, Florence, Italy; and 2010, Florence, Italy)

== Honors and awards ==
Chen was a Fellow of the American Association for the Advancement of Science (1985), the American Physical Society, and the Neutron Scattering Society of America.

=== Selected honors ===
2008 - Elected as Academician of Academia Sinica, and Recipient of the 2008 Clifford G. Shull Prize in Neutron Science from the Neutron Scattering Society of America.
2006 - Outstanding Alumni Award from National Tsing Hua University in Taiwan. In the same year, Chen and his co-authors received the 2006 PNAS Editorial Board Cozzarelli Prize for the paper "The violation of Stokes-Einstein relation in supercooled water", [S.-H. Chen, F. Mallamace, C.-Y. Mou, M. Broccio, C. Corsaro, A. Faraone, and L. Liu, "The violation of Stokes-Einstein relation in supercooled water," Proc. Natl. Acad. Sci. USA 103,12974-12978 (2006)] for its outstanding scientific excellence and originality.
2002 - MIT Nuclear Science and Engineering Department Career Achievement Award for his contribution and achievement.
1995 - As a Fellow of the Japan Society for the Promotion of Science, he spent a month in Kyoto University in addition to conducting a lecture tour to many Japanese universities and research institutes.
1987-88 - The Alexander von Humboldt Senior Distinguished U.S. Scientist Award, in recognition of scientific achievement in research and teaching, from Germany and the "revisit" award in the summer of 1995.

== See also ==
- Arrhenius equation
- Glass transition temperature
- Nanopore
- Properties of Water
- Relaxation Time
- Stokes-Einstein relation
- Hydrogen Storage
- Activated Carbon
