= Timetrap =

1988 novel by David Dvorkin

- Author: David Dvorkin
- Language: English
- Series: Star Trek
- Release number: 40
- Publisher: Pocket Books
- Publication date: 1988
- Pages: 221
- ISBN: 0671648705
- Preceded by: Time for Yesterday
- Followed by: The Three-Minute Universe

Timetrap (ISBN 0671648705) is an original-series Star Trek novel by David Dvorkin, published by Pocket Books in 1988. For the week of June 12, 1988, Timetrap was the fifth-best-selling paperback book on The New York Times Best Seller list. The novel originally sold for US$3.95 (equivalent to $10.75 in 2025). Timetrap is Pocket's 40th numbered novel from the retronymed Star Trek: The Original Series. Simon & Schuster released an e-book version in September 2000.

The plot of the novel concerns Captain Kirk's kidnapping and brainwashing by Klingons to believe that he's time-traveled 100 years into his future. Ellen Cheeseman-Meyer, writing for Tor.com, described the story as dealing with the philosophy of perception and "drugs. Lots and lots of drugs."

== See also ==
- List of Star Trek novels
