= David Dvorkin =

UK speculative fiction writer

- Born: October 8, 1943 (age 82); Reading, Berkshire, England, UK
- Education: Indiana University Bloomington (Bachelor of Arts); University of Houston (MS)
- Occupation: Writer
- Writing career
- Period: 1977–present
- Genres: science fiction; horror; alternate history; space opera

David Dvorkin (born October 8, 1943) is an American writer of speculative fiction.

== Early life and education ==
Dvorkin was born in the United Kingdom. He earned a Bachelor of Arts in mathematics and physics from Indiana University Bloomington as well as a Master of Science in mathematics from the University of Houston. He worked at NASA (1967-1971) as an aerospace engineer on Apollo 8 through Apollo 15, and at Martin Marietta (1971-1974) on the Viking Mars program. Subsequently, he worked as a software developer and technical writer before retiring from full-time work in 2009.

== Select bibliography ==
=== Prisoner of the Blood ===
- Insatiable (1993)
- Unquenchable (1995)

=== Star Trek Universe ===
- The Trellisane Confrontation (1984)
- Timetrap (1988)
- The Captains' Honor (1989) with Daniel Dvorkin

=== Standalone novels ===
- The Children of Shiny Mountain (1977)
- The Green God (1979)
- Time for Sherlock Holmes (1983)
- Budspy (1987)
- Central Heat (1988)
- The Seekers (1988)
- Ursus (1989)
- The Cavaradossi Killings (2000)
- Pit Planet (2003)
- Dawn Crescent (2003) with Daniel Dvorkin
- Business Secrets from the Stars (2004)
- Damon the Caiman (2010)
- Earthmen and Other Aliens (2010)
- Time and the Soldier (2011)
- The Arm and Flanagan (2012)
- Children of the Undead (2012)
- Slit (2014)
- Randolph Runner (2020)
- Cage of Bone (2024)

=== Nonfiction ===
- At Home with Solar Energy (1979)
- The Dead Hand of Mrs. Stifle (2011)
- The Surprising Benefits of Being Unemployed (2012)
- Dust Net (2013)
- Once a Jew, Always a Jew? (2015)
- Self-Publishing Tools, Tips, and Techniques (2018)
- When We Landed on the Moon: A Memoir (2019)
- Corpspace: A Flight of Fancy (2025)
