= Open Content Alliance =

Group creating a digitized text archive

Open Content Alliance logo

The Open Content Alliance (OCA) was a consortium of organizations contributing to a permanent, publicly accessible archive of digitized texts. Its creation was announced in October 2005 by Yahoo!, the Internet Archive, the University of California, the University of Toronto and others. Scanning for the Open Content Alliance was administered by the Internet Archive, which also provided permanent storage and access through its website.

The OCA was, in part, a response to Google Book Search, which was announced in October 2004. OCA's approach to seeking permission from copyright holders differed significantly from that of Google Book Search. OCA digitized copyrighted works only after asking and receiving permission from the copyright holder ("opt-in"). By contrast, Google Book Search digitized copyrighted works unless explicitly told not to do so ("opt-out"), and contends that digitizing for the purposes of indexing is fair use.

Microsoft had a special relationship with the Open Content Alliance until May 2008. Microsoft joined the Open Content Alliance in October 2005 as part of its Live Book Search project. However, in May 2008 Microsoft announced it would be ending the Live Book Search project and no longer funding the scanning of books through the Internet Archive. Microsoft removed any contractual restrictions on the content they had scanned and they relinquished the scanning equipment to their digitization partners and libraries to continue digitization programs. Between about 2006 and 2008 Microsoft sponsored the scanning of over 750,000 books, 300,000 of which are now part of the Internet Archive's on-line collections.

== Opposition to Google Book Settlement ==
Brewster Kahle, a founder of the Open Content Alliance, actively opposed the proposed Google Book Settlement until its defeat in March 2011.

== Contributors ==
The following are contributors to the OCA:

- Adobe Systems Incorporated
- Boston Library Consortium
- Boston Public Library
- The Bancroft Library
- The British Library
- Columbia University Libraries
- Emory University Library
- European Archive
- Getty Research Institute
- HP Labs
- Indiana University Libraries
- Internet Archive
- Johns Hopkins University Libraries
- McMaster University
- Memorial University of Newfoundland
- Missouri Botanical Garden
- MSN
- The National Archives
- National Writers Union
- Natural History Museum, London
- National Library of Australia
- O'Reilly Media
- Perseus Project
- Prelinger Library and Prelinger Archives
- Research Libraries Group
- Rice University Libraries
- San Francisco Public Library
- Simon Fraser University Library
- Smithsonian Institution Libraries
- Universidad Francisco Marroquín, Guatemala
- University of Alberta Libraries
- University of British Columbia Library
- University of California Libraries
- University of Chicago
- University of Georgia
- University of Illinois at Urbana-Champaign
- University of North Carolina at Chapel Hill
- University of Ottawa
- University of Pittsburgh
- University of Texas
- University of Toronto
- University of Virginia Library
- Washington University in St. Louis
- William and Flora Hewlett Foundation
- Xerox Corporation
- Yahoo!
- York University Library

Biodiversity Heritage Library, a cooperative project of:

- American Museum of Natural History
- Harvard University Botany Libraries
- Harvard University, Ernst Mayr Library of the Museum of Comparative Zoology
- Missouri Botanical Garden
- Natural History Museum, London
- The New York Botanical Garden
- Royal Botanic Gardens, Kew
- Smithsonian Institution Libraries

== See also ==
- Digital library
- Google Book Search
- Internet Archive
- List of digital library projects
- Project Gutenberg
- Universal library
