= David Levinson (producer) =

American television producer and writer (1939–2019)

- Born: August 4, 1939; Chicago, Illinois, United States
- Died: November 3, 2019 (aged 80); Beverly Hills, California, U.S.
- Resting place: Mount Sinai Memorial Park Cemetery
- Occupation(s): Television producer, television writer
- Years active: 1969–2013
- Spouse(s): Jan Shutan (m. 1980; his death, 2019)
- Children: 3

David L. Levinson (August 4, 1939 – November 4, 2019) was an American television producer and writer known for such series as Hart to Hart, Nikita, 21 Jump Street, A Case of Rape and The Virginian.

He was nominated for an Emmy Award in 1971 for the television series The Bold Ones: The Senator.

David Levinson married actress Jan Shutan in 1980. He died on November 4, 2019, in Beverly Hills, California. He was buried in Mount Sinai Memorial Park Cemetery.
