= The Lights of Zetar =

- Star Trek: The Original Series episode
- Episode no.: Season 3 Episode 18
- Directed by: Herb Kenwith
- Written by: Jeremy Tarcher; Shari Lewis
- Cinematography by: Al Francis
- Production code: 073
- Original air date: January 31, 1969

Guest appearances
- Jan Shutan – Lt. Mira Romaine; John Winston – Lt. Kyle; Libby Erwin – Technician; Frank da Vinci – Crewman; William Blackburn – Lt. Hadley; Roger Holloway – Lt. Lemli

Episode chronology
← Previous "That Which Survives"	Next → "Requiem for Methuselah"
- Star Trek: The Original Series season 3

"The Lights of Zetar" is the eighteenth episode of the third season of the American science fiction television series Star Trek. Written by Jeremy Tarcher and his wife Shari Lewis and directed by Herb Kenwith, it was first broadcast on January 31, 1969.

In the episode, strange incorporeal aliens threaten the Memory Alpha station and the Enterprise.

== Plot ==
The Federation starship Enterprise is en route to Memory Alpha, a planetoid that is home to the Federation's central library. A storm-like phenomenon moving at warp speed is also on course to the planetoid. The Enterprise intercepts the storm, which enters the ship, affecting some crew members' nervous systems. Lieutenant Mira Romaine, who has been assigned to Memory Alpha and has become romantically involved with Scotty, faints from the effects of the storm. Chief Medical Officer Dr. McCoy examines Romaine, who seems unresponsive apart from making strange guttural sounds.

The storm proceeds to Memory Alpha, with the Enterprise in pursuit, and destroys the station's computer core. Captain Kirk, along with Science Officer Spock, Dr. McCoy, and Mr. Scott beam to the station to inspect the damage. Meanwhile, Romaine has visions of corpses at Memory Alpha. The landing party finds Memory Alpha's archives seriously damaged, and its staff dead, save one who makes the same guttural noises as Romaine, and then dies from what McCoy determines to be a brain hemorrhage. Kirk has Romaine beamed to the station. She is terrified to see the exact scene from her vision, and then warns that the storm is returning.

Scans of the storm determine that it is actually a group of life forms, and Kirk tries to communicate with them through the universal translator, but gets no response. After firing phaser warning shots, Kirk resorts to a full attack, and as the beams strike the storm, Romaine seems to react in pain. Scott, noticing this, begs Kirk to stop the attack.

During a discussion in the briefing room, McCoy reports that Romaine's brain wave pattern has been altered, and Spock reveals that the new pattern matches sensor data from the storm. They conclude that the alien life forms are attempting to take control of Romaine's body. To prevent this, they devise a plan to allow the aliens to take partial control and then subject Romaine to high atmospheric pressure. Before they can place her into the pressure chamber, the aliens enter Romaine's body, and begin to speak through her, identifying themselves as survivors from the long-dead planet of Zetar. They intend to live out their remaining existence using Romaine's body. With some difficulty, Scott succeeds in getting Romaine into the pressure chamber, and the aliens are eventually driven out and apparently destroyed.

With the conclusion of the crisis, Spock, McCoy, and Scott all agree that Romaine is fit to return to duty, with a new assignment to oversee salvaging and repairs of Memory Alpha's archives.

== Production ==
Episode co-writer Shari Lewis was best known as a children's entertainer, being the original puppeteer of the sock puppet Lamb Chop. She was married at the time to the episode's other credited writer, Jeremy Tarcher. The episode was filmed between November 1 and 11, 1968.

== Sequel novel ==
In Judith and Garfield Reeves-Stevens' non-canonical novel Memory Prime, Romaine participates in a project to rebuild the archives in a more secure structure. The project is soon thrown into turmoil by a murder plot that escalates into a looming crisis that threatens to repeat Memory Alpha's disaster. With the aid of the crew of the USS Enterprise, Romaine manages to avert it.

== Legacy ==
Memory Alpha, the wiki devoted to the Star Trek franchise, was named after the planetoid in this episode.

== Home video releases ==
This episode was released in Japan on December 21, 1993 as part of the complete season 3 LaserDisc set, Star Trek: Original Series log.3. A trailer for this and the other episodes was also included, and the episode had English and Japanese audio tracks. The cover script was スター・トレック TVサードシーズン

This episode was included in TOS Season 3 remastered DVD box set, with the remastered version of this episode.
