= Recollection Wisconsin =

Online database

Recollection Wisconsin (formerly Wisconsin Heritage Online) is a collaborative digitization program initiated in 2005 by WiLS (Wisconsin Library Services), the Wisconsin Historical Society, and the University of Wisconsin–Madison, with support from the Milwaukee Public Library, the Milwaukee Public Museum, the Wisconsin Department of Public Instruction's Division for Libraries, Technology, and Community Learning, and grant funding from the Nicholas Family Foundation. The founding mission of Wisconsin Heritage Online was "to inspire education and discovery by making Wisconsin's cultural heritage available to the public via the World Wide Web."

The program relaunched with a new name, Recollection Wisconsin, in 2013. The new Recollection Wisconsin website combines "the deep search and browsing capabilities of the old Wisconsin Heritage Online with curated tours of materials and interactive social media functions."
