= Piero Baglioni =

Italian chemist

- Born: 1952 (age 73–74); Florence, Italy
- Citizenship: Italian
- Known for: Cultural Heritage conservation
- Awards: ECIS - Rhodia European Colloid and Interface Prize (2002), European Grand Prix for Innovation Award (2003)
- Scientific career
- Fields: Chemistry, Nanotechnology, Colloids
- Institutions: University of Florence; MIT

Piero Baglioni (born 1952, in Florence) is an Italian chemist and University professor at the University of Florence. Baglioni produced several innovations in the field of both inorganic and organic colloids. Baglioni is the author of more than 250 publications on books and largely diffused international journals. He is also the author of 16 patents for the preparation of aqueous suspensions at high concentration of particulate, for the therapy and photodynamic diagnosis of tumors, for the conservation of the cultural heritage, for the setup of a new process for the treatment of textile industrial waste, for production of emulsions from Bio Crude Oil, for production of nanoparticles and novel nano-coatings via flame-spraying, and using homogeneous and heterogeneous solutions.

== Research and achievements ==
Within the broad field of modern colloid and surface chemistry, his research is mainly concentrated into the following areas:

1. Self-assembly of bio-inspired surfactants (nucleolipid and ascorbic acid derivatives) and of biomolecules (cyclodextrins)
2. Core-shell nanostructures with tunable magnetic properties
3. Inorganic nanophases applied to Cultural Heritage conservation and to nanocoating of materials (building materials, textiles, etc..)
4. Interaction potentials in protein solutions
5. Nanostrucutured surfaces for biosensors application
6. Additive effects on microstructure and hydration in cement pastes
7. Confined water in inorganic and biological matrices.

Baglioni is currently Full Professor of Physical Chemistry and lecturer of Physical Chemistry of Disperse Systems and Interfaces at the Department of Chemistry of the University of Florence. He has been appointed as Visiting Scientist/Professor by several laboratories such as the Department of Chemistry of the University of Houston, the Weizmann Institute, the Collège de France, and M.I.T. He is the Director of the National Consortium for Nanosystems (CSGI) and in the Advisory Board and reviewer of several international journals and International organization (European Science Foundation (ESF), National Science Foundation (NSF)). He is member of the scientific board of several national and international Institutions, industries (Italcementi, FAST, HMI, etc.) and Journals, coordinator of several National and European Union’s projects.

== Honors and awards ==
Baglioni received in 2002 the ECIS - Rhodia European Colloid and Interface Prize for Colloids and Interfaces for his work on surfactants organizing in micelles with recognition between head-groups.

He also received the 2003 European Grand Prix for Innovation Award.

In 2010 he was honored as Caballero Aguila which is the most prestigious recognition from CONACULTA-INAH for the Mexican Cultural Heritage conservation.

In 2011 he was awarded for Lifetime Achievement by the Journal of Colloid and Interface Science.
