= List of digital library projects =

This is a list of digital library projects.

| Name | Subject(s) | Volumes | Description | Provider(s) | Ref. |
|---|---|---|---|---|---|
| Access to Insight | Theravada Buddhism | | Provides translated texts from the Tipitaka, and contemporary materials published by the Buddhist Publication Society and many teachers from the Thai Forest Tradition | Barre Center for Buddhist Studies | |
| Ahlul Bayt Digital Islamic Library Project (Ahlul Bayt DILP) | Shia Islam | | Digitizes and presents resources related to history, law, and society of the Islamic religion and its personalities with particular emphasis on the Twelver Shi'ah Islamic school of thought | Ahlul Bayt Digital Islamic Library Project | |
| Aozora Bunko | Japanese language | | Digitized Japanese language texts | Aozora Bunko | |
| Arnetminer | Computer science and information science | | A free online service used to index and search academic social networks, hosted at Department of Computer Science and Technology of Tsinghua University | Arnetminer | |
| Arts and Humanities Data Service | Arts and humanities | | Images, texts and datasets largely collected from UK universities. Ceased operation in 2008. | King's College London | |
| ArXiv | Science and mathematics | | Preprints in mathematics, physics, computer science, quantitative biology and statistics | Cornell University | |
| French: L'Association des Bibliophiles Universels | French literature | | Digitizes French texts in the public domain | Conservatoire National des Arts et Métiers | |
| Atoll Digital Library | General | | Open source software for building digital library collections | Atoll Digital Library | |
| Australian Islamic Library | Tafsir, hadith, fiqh, Usool and Islamic Scholarship – Sunni School of thought | | Hosts over 35 classical and contemporary exegeses of the Quran, all major books of hadith, a large number of books on biographies of early Muslims and many other related titles. The library serves an international audience and offers books in numerous international languages. | Australian Islamic Library | |
| Avalon Project | Legal studies and history | | Documents in law, history and diplomacy | Yale Law School | |
| Baen Free Library | Science fiction and fantasy | | Science fiction and fantasy from publishing house Baen Books | Baen Books | |
| Bartleby.com | Literature, reference and verse | | Literature, reference and verse | Bartleby.com | |
| Biblioteca Digital Hispánica | General | | Literature, pictures, records, memorabilia | | |
| Biodiversity Heritage Library (BHL) | Natural history, botany, zoology | 112,000+ volumes; 40+ million pages | An open access digital library for biodiversity literature. BHL operates as a consortium of natural history and botanical institutions around the world that cooperate to digitize the natural history literature in their collections and make it openly available through their website. | BHL Member Institutions | |
| BIVALDI – Valencian Digital Library | General | 1.2+ million digital objects | A wide variety of heritage digital collections | Valencian Library | |
| Bookshare | General | 42,000+ | A library serving accessible books (DAISY and BRF) to people with print disabilities. Currently over 42,000 popular and educational books are in the collection. | Benetech | |
| Bokselskap.no | Norwegian books | 500+ | Classical Norwegian books. | National Library of Norway | |
| British Columbia Digital Library | General | | A digital library that links many academic digital library collections around British Columbia | British Columbia Electronic Library Network | |
| British History Online | History | | Core printed primary and secondary sources for the medieval and modern history of the British Isles | Institute of Historical Research, the History of Parliament Trust, and the University of London | |
| British Library Online Gallery | General | | The British Library's online gallery provides online access to a wide variety of its materials. | British Library | |
| California Digital Library | | | | | |
| Canadiana Online | History of Canada | 60,000,000+ pages | Canadian historical primary sources, including books, newspapers, periodicals, and nationally significant archival material | Canadiana.org | |
| Carrie | | | An early full text electronic library | | |
| Catálogo de libros de texto de educación básica en México ciclo escolar 2025–2026 | Textbooks used in Mexico | 891 | Textbooks used in Mexico in preschool, primary, secondary and high school education in 2025–2026 | Comisión Nacional de Libros de Texto Gratuitos | |
| Catálogo Histórico de libros de primaria en México 1960–2019 | Historic textbooks used in Mexico 1960–2019 | 354 | Historic textbooks used in Mexico in primary education from 1960 to 2019 | Comisión Nacional de Libros de Texto Gratuitos | |
| Center for Research Libraries | General | | CRL: Edward Hunter (1902–1978) collection | | |
| Center for the Study of New Testament Manuscripts | New Testament manuscripts | | Preserve and study New Testament manuscripts | csntm.org | |
| CERN Document Server | Science | | Electronic library for CERN related documents | CERN | |
| Chinese Text Project | Chinese classic texts | | Electronic library of early Chinese texts | Chinese Text Project | |
| Choral Public Domain Library | | | | | |
| Christian Classics Ethereal Library (CCEL) | Hebrew, Greek, Latin, Catholic, and Protestant scholarship | 1,393 volumes, 440 authors | Digital library of hundreds of classic Christian books selected for edification and education, including some Greek and Roman classics. CCEL texts are stored in the library's own Theological Markup Language, which is an XML application. Texts are converted into other formats as well, such as HTML or PDF. | | |
| CiteSeerX | Computer science and information science | | A scientific literature digital library and search engine hosted at Information Sciences and Technology at the Pennsylvania State University | Pennsylvania State University | |
| Civil Rights Litigation Clearinghouse | Civil rights | | | | |
| The Collection of Computer Science Bibliographies | | | | | |
| The Complete Works of Charles Darwin Online | Biology | | | | |
| Cornell University Library Windows on the Past | | | | | |
| The Cuneiform Digital Library Initiative | Assyriology, history, archaeology | 320,000+ | Safekeeping and curating information about and images of over 320,000 objects inscribed with cuneiform text | University of California, Los Angeles | |
| D-Scribe Digital Publishing | Various academic | 100,000+ | Over 100 thematic collections that together contain over 100,000 digital objects of various academic interests, including almost 800 out-of-print titles from the University of Pittsburgh Press | University of Pittsburgh | |
| Darakht-e Danesh Library (DDL) | General | | Library of open educational resources for Afghanistan | Canadian Women for Women in Afghanistan | |
| The Dead Sea Scrolls Digital Library | Dead Sea Scrolls | | Digitized Dead Sea Scrolls | Leon Levy Foundation via the Israel Antiquities Authority | |
| Digital Accounting Collection | Accounting | | | | |
| Digital Bibliography and Library Project | | | | | |
| Digital Cicognara | Early literature of art, Leopoldo Cicognara | | Digitized books from the Cicognara Library | Digital Cicognara Partners | |
| Digital Comic Museum | Comic books | | Thousands of freely downloadable public domain Golden Age comics which are not under copyright | Digital Comic Museum website | |
| Digital Himalaya | Himalayas | | | | |
| Digital Library for Dutch literature | | | Government-funded digital library project | | |
| Digital Library of the Caribbean | Caribbean studies | | | https://www.dloc.com/ | |
| Digital Library of Georgia | General | | | | |
| Digital Library of India | | 325,473 | | | |
| Digital Media Repository | Arts and humanities, Middletown studies | | | Ball State University | |
| Digital Public Library of America | General | 49,602,373 | | | |
| Digital South Asia Library | South Asia | | Materials for reference and research on South Asia | University of Chicago | |
| Directory of Open Access Journals | General | | | | |
| Discover York Digital Library | York, United Kingdom | | Digitised collections from the University of York Library and Borthwick Institute for Archives supporting research, teaching and engagement developed by the Library Digital Technology and Innovation team | University of York | |
| Discus | South Carolina, United States | | Provides several reliable sources exclusively for school and state libraries in South Carolina | South Carolina State Library | |
| Distributed Proofreaders Canada | Toronto, Ontario, Canada | 3,000 books (approximate) | Volunteer initiative to convert books in the Canadian public domain to readable electronic formats | | |
| Domínio Público | | | | | |
| EBBA (English Broadside Ballad Archive) | English literature, English broadside ballads | Over 7,000 ballads from libraries worldwide archived | Online digital archive of primarily 17th-century English broadside ballads, digitized into multiple accessible formats for scholars and members of the general public | English Broadside Ballad Archive and University of California, Santa Barbara | |
| eBooks@Adelaide | Classic works including literature, philosophy, science, religion and history | | A collection of free ebook editions of significant works from the past | University of Adelaide | |
| EEBO – Early English Books Online | | | | | |
| eGranary Digital Library | Educational resources from over 3,000 websites and hundreds of CD-ROMs | 35,000,000+ resources | An offline digital library for communities with inadequate Internet bandwidth, i.e., developing countries, rural schools, prisons. Over 35 million resources in every format: books, journals, websites, video, audio, software, multimedia. Includes tools for patrons to create, upload, share, and archive their own content. Has built-in search tools and Web 2.0 services like Moodle, WordPress and Drupal. | The WiderNet Project, a service program of the School of Information and Library Science at the University of North Carolina at Chapel Hill | |
| The Electronic Text Corpus of Sumerian Literature | Sumeriology, history, archaeology | | Making accessible over 400 literary works composed in the Sumerian language in ancient Mesopotamia during the late third and early second millennia BC | University of Oxford | |
| EuroDocs: Online Sources for European History | European history for over 50 countries | | Facsimiles, transcriptions and translations of primary European historical documents | Brigham Young University's Harold B. Lee Library | |
| The European Digital Mathematics Library (EUDML) | Mathematics | | Groups and distributes European scientific publications on mathematics | | |
| The European Library | General | | Active until 2016, then merged into Europeana | | |
| European Navigator | | | First digital library on the history of a united Europe | | |
| Europeana | | 10,000,000+ digital objects | Linking archives, libraries, museums and audio-visual material from across Europe | | |
| FRASER | Economics | | A digital library of economic, financial and banking materials covering the economic history of the United States | Federal Reserve Bank of St. Louis | |
| Gallica | General | 10,000,000+ | French digital library | Bibliothèque nationale de France | |
| Google Books | General | 30,000,000+ | | | |
| Greenstone | General | | | | |
| Harvard University Library digital collections | General | | Links to digitized collections from the university's libraries, museums, archives and special collections, covering subjects such as art, architecture, religion, history, culture, botany, biology, landscape design, music, politics, law, and advertising. Projects involved digitizing of analog collections (including images, text, audio files, and music scores), georeferencing maps, or harvesting web resources. | Harvard University | |
| HathiTrust | General | 10,000,000+ | | | |
| Hebrewbooks.org | Rabbinical and classical Hebrew texts | 64,000+ | All texts are available for free download in PDF format. The platform features advanced search capabilities and optical character recognition (OCR) options | The Society for the Preservation of Hebrew Books | |
| Heidelberg University Digital Library | General | | Scientific publications, European historic literature of German and Latin languages | Heidelberg University | |
| Humanities | | | | University of Michigan | |
| Humbul | | | Humanities hub | | |
| Hungarian Electronic Library | Hungarian literature | | | | |
| Ibiblio | General | | | | |
| INSPIRE-HEP | High energy physics | | Scientific documents in the field of high energy physics | CERN | |
| International Association for the Preservation of Spiritualist and Occult Periodicals | Spiritualist and occult documents and literature | 6,700+ texts | "The IAPSOP is a US-based private organization focused on the digital preservation of Spiritualist and occult periodicals." | | |
| International Dunhuang Project | Manuscripts | | International collaborative effort to conserve, catalogue and digitise manuscripts, printed texts, paintings, textiles and artifacts from Dunhuang and other archaeological sites at the eastern end of the Silk Road | British Library and twenty other institutions | |
| International Music Score Library Project | | | | | |
| International Relations and Security Network (ISN), Digital Library (now part of CSS Resources) | International relations, security | | Open-source digital library service for material related to international relations (IR) and security. Available content includes PDF-documents (journal articles, books, papers, reports), a directory of IR- and security-centered organizations, and multimedia material (podcasts, videos). | Center for Security Studies at ETH Zurich | |
| Internet Archive | General | 3,100,000+ | | | |
| Internet History Sourcebooks Project | | | | | |
| Internet library sub-saharan Africa (ilissAfrica) | | | | | |
| Internet memory | General | | Internet Memory Foundation was a non-profit institution. It actively supported the preservation of Internet as a new media for heritage and cultural purpose. Defunct in 2018. | | |
| Internet Sacred Text Archive | Religion | 1,700+ | Archive of public domain texts from spiritual or religious customs and traditions | | |
| JamJar Story | Social research | | A UK based digital video library containing hundreds of snapshots of daily life across the UK | JamJar Story | |
| JSTOR | General | | Subscription required. Page image archive of important scholarly journals, with searchable OCR text. | | |
| Knowlton Digital Library | Architecture Digital Collection | | Collection of student work from Knowlton School and images of Ohio state architecture | | |
| Kujawsko-Pomorska Digital Library | General | | | | |
| The Kurdish Digital Library | General | | The Digital Library consists of writings about the Kurds and Kurdistan. Its aim is to make the Kurdish cultural heritage available as digital data. Page image archive of important scholarly journals, with searchable OCR text. | Kurdish Institute of Paris | |
| LacusCurtius | Classical studies | | Ancient Roman texts and archaeology | | |
| The Latin Library | | | | | |
| Law Library of Congress | Sources of law | 413,273 | Collection of statutes and other sources of law from all over the world, with English summaries. | Library of Congress | |
| Learning Ally | General | | A digital library serving accessible audio textbooks and general titles to people with print disabilities. Currently over 75,000 popular and educational books in the collection. | Learning Ally | |
| Library of Economics and Liberty | | | | Liberty Fund | |
| Librivox | Public domain books in the United States | | An online digital library of free public domain audiobooks, read by volunteers. Around ninety percent of the collection is in English. | | |
| Literary Kicks | | | | | |
| Ludwig von Mises Institute: Literature | Libertarianism and economics | | Libertarian and Austrian School economics resources | Ludwig von Mises Institute | |
| Luna Digital Image Collection | Arts and humanities | 80,000+ | Repository of images from the Folger Shakespeare Library Collection, including content related to William Shakespeare, the early modern period, and performance history | Folger Shakespeare Library | |
| Making of America collections | General | | | | |
| Marefa | Arabic literature | | Digitizes Arabic classics and classics of other languages that are written in Arabic script | Marefa | |
| Marxists Internet Archive | | | A multilingual digital library of works by Marxist, communist, socialist, and anarchist writers | | |
| Maryland Digital Cultural Heritage | General | | | | |
| Memoriademadrid Digital Library | General | | A Spanish digital library that provides access to the cultural heritage of the city of Madrid. Memoriademadrid digitizes heritage collections from the archives, libraries and museums belonging to the Local Government of Madrid. | Biblioteca Digital memoriademadrid | |
| Metelwin Digital Library | General, heritage | | Online digital library containing books, magazines, journals, newspapers and manuscripts with index and searchable OCR text. Contains digitized regional heritage collections and collections of different ephemeral printed materials. All content free for use. | Metelwin Digital Library | |
| Metropolitan Museum of Art | General | | Librarians and interns at the Thomas J. Watson Library have digitized over 250 early museum publications. | Metropolitan Museum of Art | |
| Michael: Multilingual Inventory of Cultural Heritage in Europe | General | | A project funded by the European Commission to give access to digital collections in European archives, museums and libraries | | |
| Michigan Digitization Project | General | | | | |
| Microsoft Academic Knowledge Graph (MAKG) | Science | | The Microsoft Academic Graph (MAKG) is a large RDF data set with over eight billion triples with information about scientific publications and related entities, such as authors, institutions, journals, and fields of study. The data set is licensed under the Open Data Attributions license. | University of Freiburg (original files: Microsoft Academic) | |
| Miguel de Cervantes Virtual Library | General | | | | |
| The Muslim Philanthropy Digital Library | | | MPDL covers material from 1900 to the present. It encompasses the diverse cultural, political and social factors influencing the practice of philanthropy as well as the significant contributions from across Muslim-majority countries to contemporary global philanthropic practice. | The Muslim Philanthropy Digital Library | |
| Mutopia project | | | | | |
| NALANDA | | | | | |
| Nashriyah | General | | 20th-century periodicals in Persian | University of Manchester Library | |
| National Academies Press | General | 3,600+ | | | |
| National Diet Library Digital Collections | Japanese language | | Digitized Japanese language texts | National Diet Library | |
| National Digital Information Infrastructure and Preservation Program | General | | | | |
| National Digital Library of India (NDLI) | General | 149,052,675 (in September 2026) | | | |
| National Digital Library Program | General | | | | |
| National Electronic Library | General | 1,671,878+ | Books, newspapers and magazines in Russian libraries | | |
| National Library for the Blind | General | | | | |
| Neliti | General | 50,000+ | Collection of Indonesian books, reports and academic journals | National Library of Indonesia | |
| New Advent | Catholic | 595 | Includes the Catholic Encyclopedia, Summa Theologica, Church Fathers, papal encyclicals, and similar documents. All documents are in English except the Bible. | Kevin Knight | |
| New York Public Library NYPL Digital Gallery | General | | | | |
| New Zealand Electronic Text Centre | | | | | |
| Ohio e-book Project | General | | Available through multiple library systems for cardholders in the state of Ohio | | |
| On This Day | | | | | |
| Online Books Page | General | | Provides an extensive list of digital book available online | | |
| Online Text Library of the University of Texas at Austin | General | | | | |
| Open Access Digital Theological Library | Religious studies | 190,000+ | Includes fully open access religious studies content with a stable URL that is cataloged in World Cat. | Digital Theological Library | |
| Open Content Alliance | General | | | | |
| Open Library | General | 1,000,000+ | | | |
| Open University Library | General | | The online library from the Open University is a gateway to a wide range of online information resources. The library website provides access to a world-class collection of resources that enhance the learning experience of students and support the learning, teaching, research and personal development of members of staff. | Open University Library | |
| OSU Library Electronic Publishing Center | General | | | | |
| Oxford Text Archive | AHDS Literature, Languages and Linguistics | | | | |
| PAIL Solicitors Digital Media and Entertainment Resource Library | Digital media and entertainment | | An index divided into two main categories, digital media, technology and entertainment; and website and mobile apps projects, consisting of seven subcategories. The site includes more than 100 articles and comments related to law, society and policy. | PAIL Solicitors Resource Library | |
| Pandora Archive | General | | | | |
| Panjab Digital Library | Panjabi literature | 65,000,000+ pages from over 700,000 documents | A NGO digitizing and preserving cultural heritage of Punjab. There are many historically significant documents stored and made available online at www.PanjabDigiLib.org. Its scope covers Punjabi culture. The library funded by the Nanakshahi Trust was launched online in August 2009. It is located at Chandigarh. | | |
| Paperity | General | 1,500,000+ articles from 4,200+ journals | An aggregator of open access scholarly journals. Contains full-text articles from all academic disciplines, from different countries and languages. Provides multifaceted full-text search, browse by journal, RSS feeds, mobile application to access the literature. | Paperity | |
| Perseus Project | General | | | | |
| PortailCoop | Cooperatives | | Contains thousands of documents on cooperatives in 29 languages and from 75 countries. | InMédia Technologies and Institut international des coopératives Alphonse-et-Dorimène-Desjardins | |
| Project Diana | | | Online human rights library; division of the Avalon Project | Yale Law School | |
| Project Gutenberg | General | 65,400+ | Founded in 1971, this was the first project to create a library of freely available online texts. | | |
| Project Gutenberg Australia | General | | Provides texts under copyright law of Australia | | |
| Project Gutenberg Canada | General | | Provides texts under Canadian copyright law | | |
| Project Laurens Janszoon Coster | Dutch literature | | A collection of Dutch high literature; no longer maintained since 2001 | | |
| Project Madurai | Tamil literature | | A collection of Tamil literature | | |
| Project Noolaham | General | | | | |
| Project Rastko | Serbian literature | | Publishes Serbian and Serbian-related digital material, both in the public domain and copyrighted | | |
| Project Runeberg | Nordic literature | | | | |
| Project Sugita Genpaku | | | Translating any text without permission, if there is no copyright trouble. Commercial use of texts is also allowed. | | |
| Project Translatio | General | | 19th- and 20th-century periodicals in Arabic, Persian and Ottoman Turkish | University of Bonn | |
| Projekt-Gutenberg-DE | Free literature in German language | | Texts (usually one chapter per HTML page) are free for private use but the site claims the rights for commercial distribution. | | |
| Questia Online Library | General | | Defunct; shut down in January 2021 | | |
| Rahnuma eBooks Library | General, Islamic | 30000+ | Collaborative project. Islamic texts from various sources, collected high-quality ebooks with an open license. | Nadeem Akhtar, Rahnuma eBooks Library | |
| Rare Book Room | General | | | | |
| Readme.cc | General | | Books translated into 10 languages | European Commission | |
| Rubicon Research Repository | Environmental physiology | | | | |
| Runivers | Russian literature | | Website devoted to Russian culture and history | | |
| Russian National Electronic Children Library | Russian children's literature | | | | |
| Russian State Historic Public Library | Russian literature | | | | |
| Russian State Library | Russian literature, art, foreign countries' books | | | | |
| Sardegna Digital Library | Sardinian culture | | Multimedia materials designed to represent Sardinia | Taulara Srl – document service provider | |
| SciElo | | | | | |
| Scriptorium | Swiss newspapers | 2,500,000+ pages | Digitized and full text searchable Swiss newspapers published in canton of Vaud in the last 250 years | University of Lausanne | |
| Sefaria | Jewish religious texts | | Free-content digital library of Jewish texts | | |
| Shia Islamic Library Archive – multi-language | Islam | | Digitizes and archive of Islamic Literature (largest collection of Islamic books online) in several languages | Shia Islamic Library Project | |
| Sophie Project | German women's literature | 1,500+ | Digitizes and distributed German-speaking women's writing in the public domain | Brigham Young University | |
| South Asian American Digital Archive | South Asian Americans | | Documents, preserves and provides access to the material history of the South Asian American community | | |
| Standard Ebooks | General | | | Standard Ebooks project Public Domain | |
| Swiss Foundation Public Domain | Public domain music | 50,000+ gramophone records and phonograph cylinders | A project for the conservation and utilization of public domain music and film material | Swiss Foundation Public Domain | |
| Texas Digital Library | General | | | | |
| Text Creation Partnership | General | | Three collections (EEBO/TCP, ECCO/TCP, Evans/TCP) | | |
| Textos.info – biblioteca digital abierta | Spanish literature | 5,000+ | Open virtual library for public domain and Creative Common books written in Spanish. All content can be read online or downloaded in major ebook formats (PDF, ePUB, MobiPocket) for free. Registered users can add new texts. | Eduardo Robsy Petrus | |
| TITUS – Thesaurus of Indo-European Texts and Language Materials database | | | Aims to prepare all textual material relevant for Indo-European Studies (including Middle Iranian, Tocharian etc.) in electronic form for analysis | Goethe University Frankfurt | |
| Traditional Knowledge Digital Library | Indian literature | | Repository of the traditional knowledge of India, setup to protect the ancient and traditional knowledge of the country from exploitation such as unethical patents and monopolization | | |
| UK Web Archive | General | | The UK Web Archive is a partnership of the six UK legal deposit libraries which aims to collect all UK websites at least once each year. | Bodleian Libraries, British Library, Cambridge University Library, National Library of Scotland, National Library of Wales, Trinity College Dublin | |
| UNESCO Digital Library | World peace, education and culture | | Documents related to UNESCO activities | UNESCO | |
| United States National Agricultural Library | Agriculture | | | | |
| Universal Digital Library | General | 1,500,000+ | A book digitization project, led by Carnegie Mellon University School of Computer Science and University Libraries. Working with government and research partners in India (Digital Library of India) and China, the project is scanning books in many languages, using OCR to enable full text searching, and providing free-to-read access to the books on the web. Ended in 2008. | | |
| University of Michigan Library Digital Library Production Service | General | | | | |
| University of Pittsburgh Archives Service Center | Univ. of Pittsburgh Archives; 20th-century urban renewal; Business & industry; Ethnic groups in Pittsburgh; Labor & politics; Social action & Women's history; Audio-visual materials | | | | |
| University of Wisconsin Digital Collections | General | | | University of Wisconsin–Madison | |
| US National Library of Medicine | | | | | |
| Varna Digital Library, Варненска дигитална библиотека | General | | A project for digitization of periodicals, postcards and photos related to Varna from the end of the 19th and early 20th centuries | | |
| Vascoda | General | | German internet-portal for scientific and scholarly information, offering interdisciplinary and subject-specific search | | |
| Victoria University in the University of Toronto | General | | Digital collections from the university's library, archives and special collections. Areas of strength: William Blake, Samuel Taylor Coleridge, Northrop Frye, E. J. Pratt, John Wesley, Virginia Woolf / Bloomsbury Group. | Victoria University in the University of Toronto | |
| Vilnius University Library Digital Collections | General | 8,000 | Digital collections from Vilnius University Library's special archives: rare books, manuscripts, graphic art and photography collections dedicated for studies, research and cultural education | Vilnius University Library | |
| Virtually Missouri | General | | Digital collections from Missouri libraries, museums, and cultural institutions | | |
| Wellcome Collection | Health and the human experience | 45,000,000 images from 280,000 items | Large and growing digitised collection covering an array of topics relating to health and the human experience in many forms, from recently published books to historical manuscripts and objects. | Wellcome Collection | |
| Welsh Journals Online | General | | | National Library of Wales | |
| Wikibooks | General | | A digital library of new books edited in a similar way to Wikipedia | | |
| Wikilala | History of Ottoman Empire | | Digital library project | | |
| Wikisource | General | 3,500,000+ | A digital library of out-of-copyright or freely licensed books | | |
| Wired for Books | | | A project of the WOUB Center for Public Media at Ohio University | | |
| Wisconsin Heritage Online | | | A collaborative statewide portal to Wisconsin's history | | |
| Wisconsin Historical Society Digital Collection | History | | Wisconsin state, regional, and local history books, journals, and museum collections | Wisconsin Historical Society | |
| Wordtheque | | | Word by word multilingual library | | |
| World Digital Library | General | | | Library of Congress | |
| World Wide Web Virtual Library | General | | | | |
| Zendy | Multidisciplinary | Unknown (282,165,495) | Focus on open access academic journals, articles, books, and book chapters | Knowledge E, Zendy | |
| Zeno.org | | | | | |
| Projecto Adamastor | Portuguese literature | | Collaborative project, gathers Portuguese texts from various sources, revises, edits, produces and publishes high-quality ebooks with an open license. | | |
| The Braille Library | General, Braille | 7023712 | Braille literary materials in .brf file format. | Ian Keh, The Braille Library | |

== See also ==
- Bibliographic database
- List of academic databases and search engines
- List of online databases
- List of online encyclopedias
- List of open-access journals
- List of search engines
