= Discus (disambiguation) =

The discus throw is a track and field event in which athletes throw a heavy disc as far as they can.

Discus may also refer to:

== Aviation ==
- Aeros Discus, a Ukrainian hang glider design
- Pegas Discus, a Czech two-place paraglider design
- Schempp-Hirth Discus, a German competition sailplane design

== Other ==
- Discus (comics), a fictional character from the Marvel Comics Universe and enemy of Luke Cage
- Discus (fish), a freshwater fish popular with aquarium keepers
- Discus (gastropod), a genus of snails in the family Discidae
- Discus intervertebralis, a cartilage between vertebrae
- DISCUS, a data compression algorithm
- Discus (website), a digital library for residents in South Carolina
- Discobolus, a Greek sculpture
- Distilled Spirits Council of the United States, a national trade association representing producers and marketers of distilled spirits sold in the United States
- Discus Awards, a U.S.-based national high school awards and recognition program
- Disqus a blog comment hosting service
- The Discus, an eating and debating club within the National Arts Club

== See also ==
- Sudarshana Chakra, a weapon sometimes referred to as the discus of Vishnu
- Disc (disambiguation)
- Discuss
