= Discoid =

Discoid may refer to:

- Disk (mathematics), the region in a plane enclosed by a circle

== Medicine ==
- Furosemide, a medication sold under the trade name Discoid
- Discoid meniscus, a human anatomical variant
- Discoid lupus erythematosus, a chronic skin condition in humans
  - Canine discoid lupus erythematosus, the equivalent condition in dogs
- Nummular dermatitis, also known as discoid eczema

== Biology ==
- Discoid head, a type of floret arrangement in Asteraceae flower heads
- Discoidal cleavage, a type of partial cleavage in embryos
- Discoidin domain, a protein domain of many blood coagulation factors
- Blaberus discoidalis, the discoid cockroach
- Dictyostelium discoideum, a slime mold

== Other ==
- Discoidal stele, a funerary stele type found in Basque country

== See also ==
- Disc (disambiguation)
