= Readme (disambiguation) =

A README file contains information about the other files in a directory or archive of computer software.

Readme or README may also refer to:

- Readme.cc, an online book portal since 2008
- README.txt (book), a 2022 memoir by Chelsea Manning
- Reamde, a 2011 technothriller with an intentionally misspelled title
