= R. Sivachandran =

R. Sivachandran is a Sri Lankan geography teacher.

== Career ==
Sivachandran began his teaching career as a lecturer in geography at the University of Peradeniya and the University of Kelaniya.

In 1980, he joined the University of Jaffna as a senior lecturer. In 1998, he was promoted to professor. During his tenure, he served as head of the Department of Geography, acting head of the Department of Sociology, coordinator of extra-mural studies, and dean of the Faculty of Arts (2004–2007). He also helped establish the university's Media Resource and Training Centre.

== Other work ==
Sivachandran has also had multiple editorial and advisory roles throughout his career. He was an editorial advisor to Markam, the Journal of the Marga Institute in Colombo, in 1992, and the editor of Chinthanai, the journal of the Faculty of Arts at the University of Jaffna, in 1996. He also acted as a consultant for Jaffna Geographer, the Journal of the Geographical Society at the University of Jaffna. He is also an advisory member of the Noolaham Foundation.

He was president of the University Teachers' Association from 1998–2000.

== Personal life ==
Sivachandran lives in Jaffna, Sri Lanka.
