= Se. Ganesalingan =

Sri Lankan writer

- Born: 9 March 1928; Urumpirai, Jaffna District, Jaffna, Sri Lanka
- Died: 4 December 2021 (aged 93); Chennai, Tamil Nadu, India
- Occupations: author, writer, Marxist

Se. Ganesalingan (Tamil: செ. கணேசலிங்கன்; 9 March 1928 – 4 December 2021) was a Sri Lankan author and a veteran Marxist. He was one of the prominent writers who predominantly contributed to Tamil literature in Sri Lanka He wrote and published several books in his illustrious career often covering wide range of interests such as caste, religion, sociology, political science, feminism and art.

== Biography ==
He was born on 9 March 1928 in Urumpirai, Jaffna District in the Northern Province of Sri Lanka. His daughter Maanvili Chithamparanathan and his son G. Kumaran both pursued their careers in publishing. During the Black July riots in 1983, a Sinhalese family volunteered to provide shelter to him and his family.

== Career ==
He joined the government service soon after completing his academic career and his academic career turned out to be a modest in terms of his standards. He was transferred to serve in areas outside his hometown at Trincomalee in the Eastern Province and at Colombo in the Western Province. After serving at Trincomalee and Colombo, during duration between 1950 and 1981, he retired from treasury.

He had a knack for writing, which he developed from his school days. His first story was published in 1950 and after a gap of eight years, he launched a collection of short stories with a foreword by a renowned Tamil scholar Mu. Varadarajan which was dubbed as 'Mu Va'. He attained inspiration from the writings of prominent Marxist philosophers including the likes of Antonio Gramsci, Louis Althusser and Theodor Adorno and also was influenced by the works of Mahatma Gandhi. His writings were predominantly depicting Marxian philosophical ideology.

He launched his first novel titled Neenda Payanam (Long Journey) in 1965 and the novel was based on caste oppression. His debut novel received positive reception among critics and it fetched him an award from the Sri Lanka Sahitiya Mandalaya. He launched a press named Kumaran in 1971 and began publishing a monthly magazine under the same name with the intention of articulating his leftist-marxian philosophy and communism ideology. Popular Tamil linguist M. A. Nuhman once came to the defense of Se. Ganesalingan's literary works by insisting politics cannot be separated from literature.

He eventually ended up writing around 71 novels, seven collections of short stories, eight books focusing on children's literature as well as 22 collections of essays. He wrote and published about ten novels between 1987 and 1999 depicting about the essence of ethnic Tamil culture. He was also known for his non-fiction literary work which included the events involving Chile, Vietnam and Kachatheevu. He also published journal articles for The Hindu.

== Death ==
He died on 4 December 2021 at his daughter Maanvili Chithamparanathan's residence in Chennai, Tamil Nadu. He was 93 at the time of his death.
