= Shakespeare Society of Zanesville =

Organization based in Ohio, United States

The Shakespeare Society of Zanesville was founded in Zanesville, Ohio in 1901. Since that date, its members have met regularly to read William Shakespeare’s plays aloud and in character. It is (likely) the oldest continuously-active society in the United States focused on reading Shakespeare’s canon.

== The first Zanesville Shakespeare club (1877-1884) ==
Zanesville’s first Shakespeare reading society assembled on April 23, 1877, and was called the Zanesville Shakespeare Reading Club. Its secretary, Agnes Fillmore, persuaded Joseph Crosby, a prominent early American Shakespeare scholar and collector, to serve as the club’s first president. Fillmore and Crosby married in 1878. Crosby’s letters reveal that the couple “took the fortnightly reading evenings very seriously,” and provide insights into the club’s meetings, including “under which circumstances women took men’s roles, what plays were chosen and how long it took to read one, what happened when young ladies encountered bawdy passages in the unexpurgated text, and so forth.”

The group disbanded no later than 1884, when Crosby fled town in financial straits. Much of Crosby’s important collection of books, Shakespeareana, and his own notes and letters is now in the Folger Shakespeare Library, the University of Wisconsin Library, and the University of Michigan Library.

== The Shakespeare Society of Zanesville (founded 1901) ==
On April 29, 1901, Presbyterian pastor R.T. Lynd added readings of Shakespeare plays to the activities of his church’s youth group meetings. Not long afterwards, The Shakespeare Society of Zanesville was opened to the general public.

Charter member Mabel Thompson recalled in 1941 that the first meeting of the Society was attended by twenty-five young people, including herself, C.T. Atwell, Louise Stewart, Harry Baldwin, R.S. Conner, Manley Thompson, Dolly Van Voorhis, Georgia Baldwin, Winifred Hahn, Rena Wall, Edna Bell, Mame Axline, Mary Stevens, Elizabeth Herdman, and four women she identified only by their later, married names (Mrs. James F. Cole, Mrs. R.S. Conner, Mrs. R. T. Lynd, and Mrs. A.W. Richards). At that meeting, she noted, it was decided to focus on Shakespeare’s plays, and “members of the group agreed that the most successful method for perusing the plays would be to assign the characters to different members and in that way read the plays together.”

The Society still meets monthly, either at the home of a member or in a public space like the McIntire Library or the Zanesville Museum of Art. Members answer roll call with a Shakespeare quote, in early years relating to a theme chosen for that month’s meeting (e.g., loyalty, vengeance) and latterly a quote from the play being read.

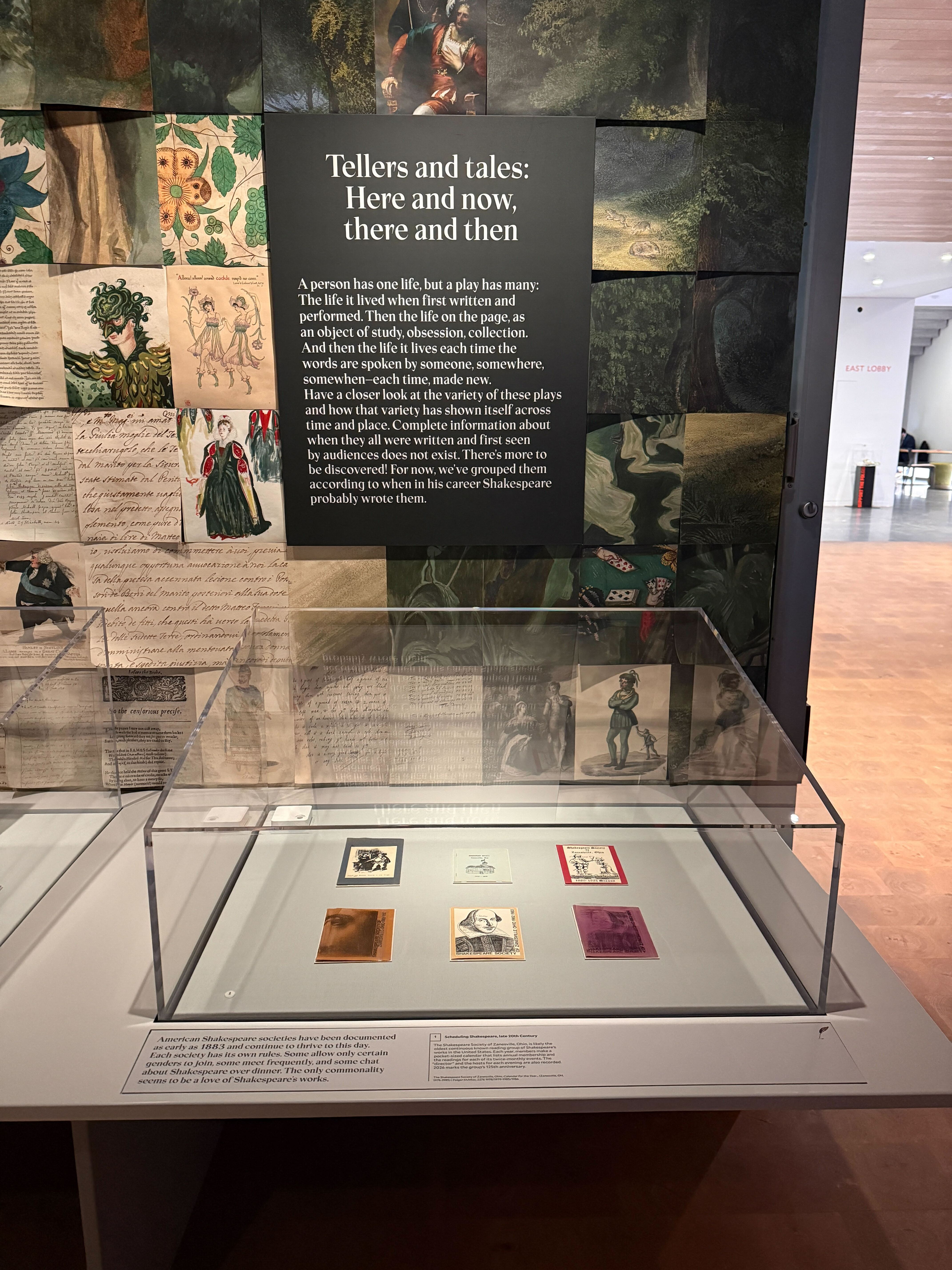
Shakespeare Society of Zanesville calendars on display in the Folger Shakespeare Library's exhibit commemorating the 250th anniversary of the signing of the Declaration of Independence

The group reads three Shakespeare plays each year, including one comedy, one tragedy, and one history play. One member (in early years called the “critic on interpretation’) is tasked with highlighting an issue or theme raised by the reading (e.g., comparing “mob activity in the plays Julius Caesar and Coriolanus”), and promoting group discussion. The evening’s director assigns parts to members, reads stage directions, and keeps the evening progressing smoothly. In early years, a member acted as “critic on pronunciation.” Starting in the 1930s, assistance with pronunciation was added to the director’s duties.

There is an annual holiday party and an annual banquet celebrating the Society’s founding, traditionally featuring costumes, performances, and presentations (as well as the Society’s colors of lavender and gold). Once a year, a calendar is published of the dates and planned readings for upcoming meetings. Copies of the Society’s calendars are included in the holdings of the Folger Shakespeare Library.

== Society presidents ==
Unless otherwise cited, the presidents' names and terms of service are taken from the calendars published annually by the Society.

- 1901-04 Rev. R.T. Lynd
- 1904-11 Mrs. Sinclair Elliott
- 1911-12 Howard McDonald
- 1912-14 Mrs. Sinclair Elliott
- 1914-15 Mary DeCamp
- 1915-17 Henry Scharnstein
- 1917-19 Erle C. Greiner
- 1919-20 Clarence Brown
- 1920-23 Erle C. Greiner
- 1923-24 Lydia G. Marsh
- 1924-25 Elizabeth A. Oldham
- 1925-27 Rachael Higgins
- 1927-30 Paul Bainter
- 1930-31 Louise B. Higgins
- 1931-33 Frank Kelly
- 1933-35 Curtis Shaw
- 1935-37 Frobisher Lyttle
- 1937-39 William O’Neal
- 1939-40 Reidar Steen
- 1940-41 Mabel Thompson
- 1942-44 Charles F. Ribble
- 1944-46 Wilfred G. Foreman
- 1946-49 Duncan Weeks
- 1949-50 Margaret O'Neal
- 1950-52 Mabel Thompson
- 1952-53 Margaret O'Neal
- 1953-54 Wilfred G. Foreman
- 1954-55 Denys Peter Myers
- 1955-56 Bernard Goldstein
- 1956-58 Robert Yockey
- 1958-59 Charles Dietz
- 1959-60 Wilfred G. Foreman
- 1960-61 James Pickering
- 1961-62 Bernard Goldstein
- 1962-63 Rachael Higgins
- 1963-65 Rolland D. Bateman, Jr.
- 1965-67 Albert Eugene McGinnis
- 1967-68 Leon Levion
- 1968-69 Ruth Ball
- 1969-70 Leonard Hammer
- 1970-71 Wilfred G. Foreman
- 1971-72 Irene Goldstein
- 1972-73 Henry Milsted
- 1973-74 A. Frederick Huish
- 1974-75 Donald Althaus
- 1975-76 George Ware
- 1976-77 Mary Milsted
- 1977-78 Albert Eugene McGinnis
- 1978-79 Irene Goldstein
- 1979-80 Robert Zimmer
- 1980-81 Rachael Higgins
- 1981-82 David Klein
- 1982-83 William F. Pomputius Jr.
- 1983-84 Anita Mikal
- 1984-85 Laura Klein
- 1985-87 Mary-Anne K. Pomputius
- 1987-88 Steven Buck
- 1988-90 Mary-Anne K. Pomputius
- 1990-93 Ruth Achauer
- 1993-95 Mary-Anne K. Pomputius
- 1995-97 Mary Miller
- 1997-2001 Mary-Anne K. Pomputius
- 2001-2003 Steven Buck
- 2003-04 Mary Ann Thress-Lentz
- 2004-05 Alta Sims
- 2005-26 J. Robert Van Gilder
