= Vifanord =

Digital library

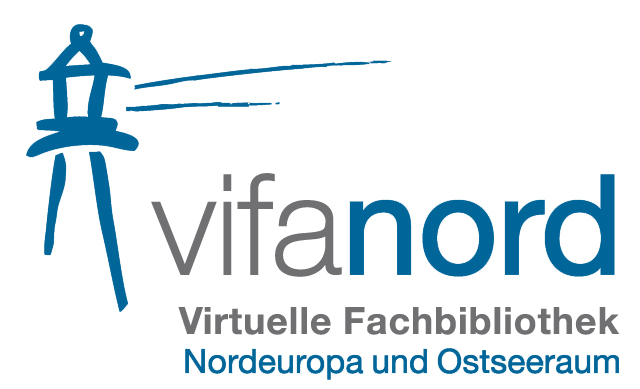
Logo

vifanord (Virtual Library of Northern European and Baltic Studies) is a digital library or internet subject gateway that provides combined access to scientifically relevant information on the Nordic countries (Denmark, Finland, Iceland, Norway, Sweden), the Baltic countries (Estonia, Latvia, Lithuania), the Baltic region as a whole and on Hanseatic topics.

It offers free and simultaneous browsing in Internet resources collections, in specialized German and international library catalogues and articles databases and leads as well to electronic journals, to congresses and to related academic events. Resources apply from the fields of political science, history, sociology, literature and linguistics, geography and folklore.

vifanord was developed as a scientific gateway from a joint project of three German university libraries in the duty of special interest collections on this cultural area (Greifswald University Library, Kiel University Library and Göttingen State and University Library). Financial funding was offered by the German Research Foundation (Deutsche Forschungsgemeinschaft). The project has been under progress since November 2006 and the virtual library went online in May 2008. Before that, in 2005, Greifswald University Library had already launched a digital library “baltica-net”, only dealing with the cultural topics of the Baltic states, having now become an integral part of vifanord. vifanord is partner of vascoda.

== See also ==
- osmikon, Das Forschungsportal zu Ost-, Ostmittel und Südosteuropa
