= University of Michigan Papyrology Collection =

Collection of ancient papyrus

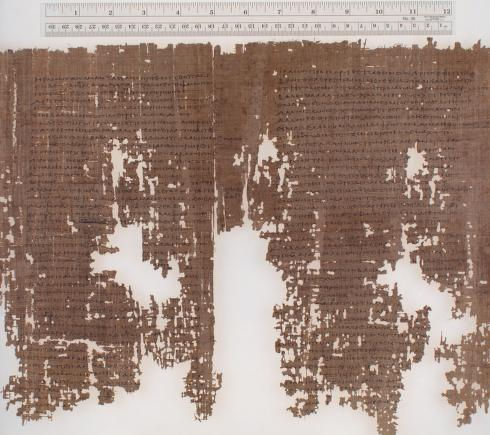
Fragment of Homer's Iliad in Michigan's Papyrus Collection

The Papyrology Collection of the University of Michigan Library is an internationally respected collection of ancient papyrus and a center for research on ancient culture, language, and history. With over 7,000 items and more than 10,000 individual fragments, the Collection is by far the largest collection of papyrus in the United States. The collection includes biblical fragments, religious writings, public and private documents, private letters, and writings on astronomy, astrology, mathematics, and magic, and the papyri span nearly two millennia of history, dating from about 1000 BC to AD 1000, with the majority dating from the third century BC to the seventh century AD.

Many of the papyri in U-M's collection were written by Greek-speaking people living in Egypt. Their use of Koine Greek is instructive as to how the ancient dialects gave way to a more standardized language. Although most examples of papyrus originate from Egypt, papyrologists generally study documents which are written in Greek—the official language of the government from the time of Alexander the Great until the Muslim conquest of Egypt.

== History ==
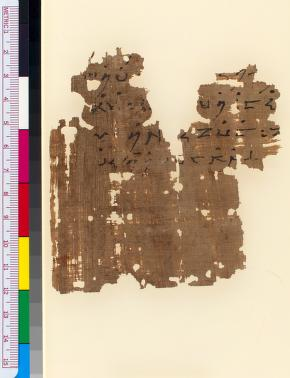
Instrumental Musical notation (Greek)

The Michigan Papyrus Collection was initially developed by Professor Francis W. Kelsey, Chairman of the Department of Latin from 1889 to 1927. While in Italy in 1915, Professor Kelsey learned of the possibility of purchasing papyri from dealers. But, since World War I was in progress, any purchasing had to wait until after the armistice of 1918. Kelsey then traveled to Egypt to acquire papyri. In February 1920, he arrived in Cairo and secured the codex of the Minor Prophets, among many other pieces. Dr. W.W. Bishop, University Librarian of the University of Michigan, was very eager to enlarge the Library's manuscript resources, and assumed responsibility for the housing and care of the papyri, as well as for providing in the Library a work room for those entrusted with their decipherment and publication.

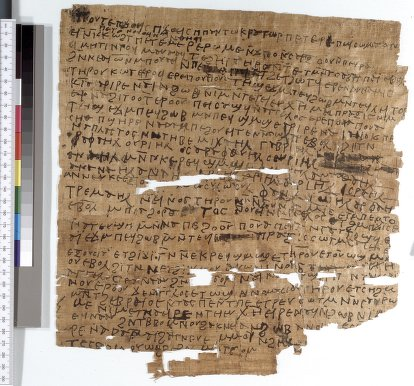
An example of a Coptic magical text

All these papyrus documents provide a unique insight into the ancient world, the social structure of ancient life in general and in detail. The contribution of the papyrus collection has been very important in the understanding of the history of Egypt under Greek and Roman rule, the structure of the society from the Ptolemaic to the Byzantine period, the administration, the personal religious beliefs of individuals, the official religions and their dogmatic clashes, the history of ancient scholarship, the schools, higher education and changes in literary taste over the periods mentioned. Among the most intriguing texts to have been unearthed are passages from sorcerers' handbooks that disclose magic spells and give instructions on their proper use.

The collection of papyri is augmented by the University's collection of ostraca, which is housed in the Kelsey Museum of Archaeology. Other ancient materials in the Collection include wood and wax tablets (unique in the ancient world because they were eraseable and re-usable).

== Professional Activities and Affiliations ==
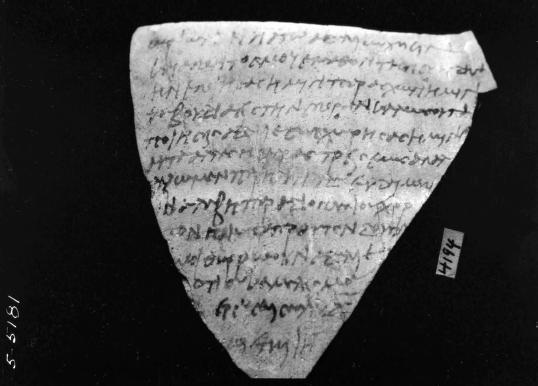
An ostracon fragment, of a personal letter

From July 29-August 4, 2007, The U-M Papyrus Collection hosted the XXV International Congress of Papyrology. The Congress is an important gathering of international scholars and researchers.

The U-M Papyrus Collection also produces the Bulletin of the American Society of Papyrologists, the only professional journal published in America for the advanced study of papyri and related topics.

== Digitization efforts ==
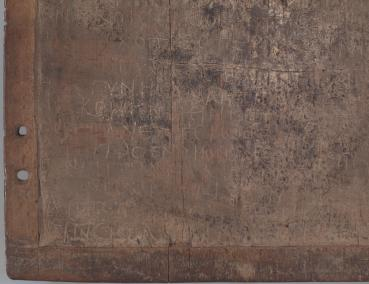
A wax tablet of Proverbs VII, 3-13, perhaps written by a schoolboy

The University of Michigan Papyrus Collection has for many years been involved in digitizing its papyrology collection. New technology has aided the study of the fragile materials, making it more easily accessible. The first digital scanner purchased by the U-M Library was used to begin digitizing its papyrus holdings, according to the Winter 2007 issue of Search and Discovery: Research at Michigan.

The University of Michigan, along with UC Berkeley, Columbia, Duke, Princeton, and Yale, is a member of the Advanced Papyrological Information System (APIS), a consortium that is working to digitize the member institutions' collections and make them available online. The Michigan APIS database currently has over 35,000 records with images, searchable in a variety of fields including date, language, origin, type of text, author, names of persons, and many more. Also included are detailed electronic images of the papyrus, publication info, and even (in some cases) a link to the Greek text on the Perseus Project website.

== See also ==
- Collections of papyri
