= M. A. Nuhman =

Sri Lankan linguist and academic (born 1944)

- எம். ஏ. நுஃமான்
- Born: 10 August 1944 (age 81); Kalmunai, Eastern Province, British Ceylon (now Sri Lanka)
- Education: University of Sri Lanka; University of Jaffna; Annamalai University
- Occupation: Academic

Macbool Alimmohamed Nuhman (born 10 August 1944) is a Sri Lankan linguist and academic. He is a poet, literary critic and translator and has published numerous books.

== Early life ==
Nuhman was born on 10 August 1944 in Kalmunai in south eastern Ceylon. He was educated at Wesley High School in Kalmunai.

== Career ==
After school Nuhman taught in Periya Kinniya before receiving training at Addalaichenai Teachers Training College. He then taught in Polonnaruwa District and Kalmunai. He joined the University of Ceylon, Colombo in 1971, graduating from the University of Sri Lanka in 1973 with a BA and BPhil degree in linguistics.

Nuhman was a lecturer in Tamil and linguistics at the University of Sri Lanka Jaffna campus, and its successor the University of Jaffna, from 1976 to 1990. He received a MA degree from the University of Jaffna in 1982 after producing a thesis on Tamil wordage of Muslims in the Batticaloa region. He received a Ph.D. degree from Annamalai University after producing a research paper titled A Contrastive Study of the Structure of the Noun Phrase in Tamil and Sinhala.

Nuhman joined the University of Peradeniya as a senior lecturer in 1991 and in 2001 he was promoted to professor of Tamil. He was visiting professor in linguistics at Tamil University in Thanjavur. He was also a visiting professor at the University of Malaya and the SIM University. He was an academic consultant for the South Eastern University of Sri Lanka and the Open University of Sri Lanka. He retired in 2009.

Nuhman was a member of the board of directors of the International Centre for Ethnic Studies and the Sri Lanka Rupavahini Corporation. He was a member of the Official Language Commission and the academic board of the National Institute of Language Education and Training. He was a member of the advisory board of the University of Colombo's Centre for Contemporary Indian Studies. He is a member of the advisory board of the Noolaham Foundation.

== Works ==
Nuhman has published more than 30 books including:

- தாத்தாமாரும் பேரர்களும் (Grandparents and Grandsons) (Readers Association, 1977)
- இருபதாம் நூற்றாண்டு ஈழத்துத் தமிழ் இலக்கியம் (Twentieth Century Eelam Tamil Literature) (Readers Association, 1979; co-authors C. Maunakuru and Chitralekha Maunaguru)
- பலஸ்தீனக் கவிதைகள் (Palestinian Poems) (Readers Association, 1981)
- அழியா நிழல்கள் (Immortal Shadows) (Narmada Publishing, 1982)
- மழை நாட்கள் வரும் (Rainy Days are Coming) (Annam, 1983)
- பதினொரு ஈழத்துக் கவிஞர்கள் (Eleven Eelam Poets) (Kalachuvadu, 1984; co-editor A. Yesurasa)
- பாரதியின் மொழிச் சிந்தனைகள்: ஒரு மொழியியல் நோக்கு (Bharathi's Language Ideas: A Linguistic Perspective) (University of Jaffna, 1984)
- திறனாய்வுக் கட்டுரைகள் (Review Articles) (Annam, 1985)
- மார்க்சியமும் இலக்கியத் திறனாய்வும் (Marxism and Literary Criticism) (1985)
- Communication, Language and Modernization (1993)
- அடிப்படைத் தமிழ் இலக்கணம் (Basic Tamil Grammar) (Readers Association, 1999)
- மஹாகவியின் மூன்று நாடகங்கள் (Mahakavi's Three Plays) (National Art Literary Council, 2000)
- ஆரம்ப இடைநிலை வகுப்புகளில் தமிழ் மொழி கற்பித்தல் (Teaching Tamil Language in Early Intermediate Classes) (Colombo Tamil Association, 2002)
- Lankan Mosaic: Translation of Sinhala and Tamil Short Stories (Colombo, Three Wheeler Press, 2002; co-editors Ashley Halpe, Ranjini Obeyesekere)
- A Contrastive Grammar of Tamil and Sinhala Noun Phrase (University of Peradeniya, 2003; ISBN 9789555890595)
- Understanding Sri Lankan Muslim Identity (International Centre for Ethnic Studies, 2004)
- மொழியும் இலக்கியமும் (Language and Literature) (Kalachuvadu, 2006)
- Sri Lankan Muslims: Ethnic Identity within Cultural Diversity (International Centre for Ethnic Studies, 2007; ISBN 9789555801096)
- Lost Evenings, Lost Lives: Tamil Poets from Sri Lanka's War (Arc Publications, 2015; co-authors V. I. S. Cheran and V. I. S. Jayapalan; ISBN 9781904614999)
