= Averbis =

Averbis GmbH
- Company type: Private
- Industry: Software
- Founded: 2007
- Headquarters: Freiburg, Germany
- Products: text mining, text analytics, Analytics, Enterprise Search, Big Data, Semantic Search
- Website: http://www.averbis.com

Averbis has a focus on healthcare, pharma, automotive and intellectual property analytics. Averbis is involved in various research projects of the German Federal Ministry of Economics and Energy and the European Union such as DebugIT, EUCases, Mantra and SEMCARE.

In addition to these projects, Averbis was also involved in the following projects:

Greenpilot is a virtual library, which provides technical information in the fields of nutrition, environment and agriculture. Medpilot is a virtual library, which provides information about medicine and related sciences.

In 2013, Averbis has been nominated for the German Founder Prize 2013.

Averbis GmbH provides text analytics and text mining software to transform unstructured text into actionable information. It was founded in 2007 by IT experts after years of relevant scientific experience in the field of text mining and multilingual information retrieval. Averbis works in the field of terminology management, natural language processing, machine learning and semantic search. Its text mining software is embedded into the text mining framework UIMA.

== See also ==
- Enterprise Search
- Information retrieval
- Linguistics
- Knowledge Management
- Natural Language Processing
- Semantics
