= Disc =

Disc or disk may refer to:

== Science and technology ==
=== Computing ===
- Disk storage, a data storage mechanism based on a rotating disk
  - Floppy disk
  - Optical disc
  - Hard disk drive

=== Mathematics ===
- Disk (mathematics), the region in a plane bounded by a circle
- Absolutely convex set of a real or complex vector space

=== Biology ===
- Intervertebral disc, a cartilage between vertebrae in vertebrate animals
- Disk, a part of a flower
- Death-inducing signaling complex (DISC), a protein complex

== Arts and entertainment ==
- Disc (band), an American experimental music band 1997–1999
- Disk, a 1995 promotional EP for "Everytime You Touch Me" by Moby
- Disc (magazine), a British music magazine 1958–1975

== Sports ==
- Discus throw or disc throw, a track and field event involving a heavy disc
- Frisbee, or disc, a gliding toy or sporting item
- Delaware Independent School Conference (DISC), a high-school athletic conference
- Dundee International Sports Centre (DISC), a sports centre in Scotland

== Other uses ==
- DISC assessment, a pseudoscientific personality testing tool
- Disc harrow, a farm implement for surface tillage
- Disc number, numbers assigned to Inuit by the Government of Canada
- Galactic disc, a component of disc galaxies
- Defence Intelligence and Security Centre (DISC), formerly at MOD Chicksands base, England
- Domestic international sales corporation (DISC), a provision in U.S. tax law
- International Symposium on Distributed Computing (DISC), an academic conference
- Confederation of Revolutionary Trade Unions of Turkey (Türkiye Devrimci İşçi Sendikaları Konfederasyonu, DİSK)

== See also ==
- Spelling of disc
- Cylinder (disambiguation)
- Discus (disambiguation)
