= Michigan Digitization Project =

Archival project at the University of Michigan Library

The Michigan Digitization Project is a project in partnership with Google Books to digitize the entire print collection of the University of Michigan Library. The digitized collection is available through the University of Michigan Library catalog, Mirlyn, the HathiTrust Digital Library, and Google Books. Full-text of works that are out of copyright or in the public domain are available.

According to the University of Michigan Library, they embarked on this partnership for a number of reasons:

- The project will create new ways for users to search and access Library content, opening up our library collections to our own users and to users throughout the world
- Although we have engaged in large-scale (preservation-based) conversion of parts of the Library's collection for several years, we know that only through partnerships of this sort can something of this scale be achieved
- We believe that, beyond providing basic access to Library collections, this activity is critically transformative, enabling the University Library to build on and reconceive vital Library services for the new millennium.

The project has received academic and media attention.

In February 2008, the University of Michigan announced that over 1 million books from the University of Michigan Library have been digitized. In September 2008, the University of Michigan announced the establishment of HathiTrust, a multi-institutional digital repository.

== See also ==
- List of digital library projects
