= Spelling of disc =

Disc vs. disk

Disc and disk are both variants of the English word for objects of a generally thin and cylindrical geometry. The differences in spelling correspond with regional differences and different senses of the word. For example, in the case of flat, rotational data storage media, the convention is that disk is used for magnetic storage (e.g., hard disks), while disc is used for optical storage (e.g., compact discs, better known as CDs). When there is no clear convention, disk is more popular in American English, while disc is more popular in British English.

== Disk ==
The earlier word is disk, which came into the English language in the middle of the 17th century. In the 19th century, disk became the conventional spelling for audio recordings made on a flat plate, such as the gramophone record. Early BBC technicians differentiated between disks (in-house transcription records) and discs (the colloquial term for commercial gramophone records, or what the BBC called CGRs).

== UK versus US ==
By the 20th century, the k spelling became more popular in the United States, while the c spelling was preferred in the UK. In the 1950s, when the American company IBM pioneered the first hard disk drive storage devices, it used the k spelling. Consequently, in computer terminology today, it is common for disk to refer mainly to magnetic storage devices (particularly in British English, where the term is sometimes regarded as a contraction of diskette, a much later word which derived from disk). Kodak's 1982 disc film used the c spelling. The RISC OS, developed by the British Acorn Computers in 1987, and which was subsequently forked when Acorn stopped working on it, uses disc for magnetic media.

== Computer discs ==
Some latter-day competitors to IBM prefer the c spelling. In 1979, Philips and Sony developed and trademarked the compact disc using the c spelling; it is now used consistently for optical media such as the compact disc and similar technologies.

== Medical editing ==
Disc and disk appear frequently in medical journals and textbooks, especially those in ophthalmology and orthopedics. Style guides often enforce consistency by specifying which contexts take which spelling, such as the AMA Manual of Style, which is used by many publications. It states, "For ophthalmologic terms, use disc (e.g., optic disc); for other anatomical terms, use disk (e.g., lumbar disk). In discussions related to computers, use disk (e.g., floppy disk, disk drive, diskette) (exceptions: compact disc, videodisc)."

== Sports ==
Disc sports, or disc games, are a category of activities which involve throwing and/or catching a flying disc. Participants of disc sports consistently use the c spelling when describing the sports equipment used in these activities, which includes team sports such as ultimate or individual sports such as disc golf. This is a parallel to the spelling of discus, the flat and round weight thrown in the track and field sport discus throw.
