= Questia Online Library =

Former online research library

Questia

- Full page screenshot
- Website type: Online digital library
- Available in: English
- Founded: 1998
- Dissolved: December 21, 2020
- Headquarters: Chicago, Illinois, United States
- Owner: Gale
- Commercial: Yes
- Current status: Closed

Questia was an online commercial digital repository of books and articles that had an academic orientation, with a particular emphasis on books and journal articles in the humanities and social sciences. All the text in all the Questia books and articles were available to subscribers; the site also included integrated research tools. It was founded in 1998 and ceased operations in December 2020.

== Company history ==
Troy Williams founded Questia Media Inc. in 1998, in Houston, Texas, after he graduated from Harvard Law School. Williams envisioned "digitizing the books most needed by college students, by making them accessible to all students at any time." It claimed to be the first online subscription service that provided undergraduates with unlimited access to the full texts of books and journals. The service offered individual subscription rates, for example in 2001 a month of unlimited access was about $20.

In January 2010, Questia, then based in Chicago, Illinois, was purchased by Gale, part of Cengage Learning.

In late 2020, Cengage announced it would be permanently closing Questia. The service officially ceased operations on December 21, 2020, at which point all active subscriptions were terminated.

Prior to its closure, Questia had served as a primary repository for researchers, having previously absorbed the archives of HighBeam Research when that service shut down in 2018. Because Questia routinely partnered with open-access initiatives like The Wikipedia Library to provide editors with paywalled research, the 2020 shutdown resulted in thousands of reference links becoming dead or inactive across the internet.

== Service ==
Questia offered some information free of charge, including several public domain works, publication information, tables of contents, the first page of every chapter, Boolean searches of the contents of the library, and short bibliographies of available books and articles on some 6,500 topics.

Questia did not sell ownership to books or ebooks, but rather sold monthly or annual subscriptions that allowed temporary online reading access to all 94000+ books, and 14 million + journal, magazine, and newspaper articles in their collection. The books were selected by academic librarians as credible, authoritative works in their respective areas. The librarians also compiled about 7000 reference bibliographies on frequently researched topics. The library was strongest in books and journal articles in the social sciences and humanities, with many older historical texts. Original pagination was maintained. The Questia service also featured tools to automatically create citations and bibliographies, helping writers to properly cite the materials.

A limitation to the Questia library was that new additions were available in a "beta" version only. Unlike Questia's earlier publications, these prevented users from copying text directly from the website, although one page from the publications could be printed free of charge. A charge was made for printing a range of pages.

Questia launched their Q&A blog on September 21, 2011. Q&A was divided into "Education news", "Student resources" and "Subjects" categories. "Subjects" was further broken down so readers could find specific content based on their academic needs.

Questia released an iPhone app in 2011, which was extended to the iPad the following year. Then in January 2013 Questia launched tutorials, including videos and quizzes, to teach students the research process.

== Criticism ==
Questia was criticized in 2005 by librarian Steven J. Bell for referring to itself as an academic library, when it concentrated on the liberal arts and treated users as customers rather than students. Moreover, Bell argued, Questia did not employ academic librarians or faculty. Although some of its employees had advanced library degrees, they did not work or collaborate with faculty to develop collections that served distinctive student populations.

== See also ==
- List of digital library projects
- List of academic databases and search engines
