= Vascoda =

vascoda was, until 2011, a German web portal which offered access to scientific information in various disciplines. The name vascoda is often associated with the medieval explorer Vasco da Gama, as this implies the connotation of navigating the sea of information. Initially, though, “vascoda“ is a made-up word created by an agency for naming and branding.

vascoda is also a non-profit organization which offers support and coordination of its members’ subject portals.

== vascoda ==
=== Portal ===
The vascoda web portal offers access to information and full texts on various subjects through an integrative user interface. The searches can be performed within a certain subject or interdisciplinarily. Specialized subject portals can also be accessed directly via the vascoda portal.

The vascoda portal and the integrated subject portals are set up and maintained by academic libraries and other information providers with an international reputation. These institutions provide content of high standard, parts of which cannot be found by standard web search engines.

Access to the portal is free. However, for some of its services and resources a fee is required (pay-per-view). Furthermore, vascoda is connected to local library holdings and document delivery services.

vascoda’s data are integrated into the WorldWideScience global science gateway.

=== Aim ===
The aim of vascoda is to merge academic resources into a single well-structured integrative information service.

=== Supporting organization ===
vascoda is a registered voluntary association with 42 members, which are mostly German libraries and other information providers. The association’s aim is to develop and maintain the interdisciplinary vascoda portal. The vascoda office is based in Hanover. The portal is technically run by the NRW Online Utility and Library Service Centre (hbz).

=== Subject portals integrated into vascoda ===
The following subject portals are currently accessible through the vascoda portal. Parts of their data are integrated into the vascoda search (as of June 2009):

- arthistoricum.net – Virtual Library for Art History
- b2i - library science, book studies, information science
- Cibera – Virtual Library Latin America / Spain / Portugal
- chem.de – chemistry
- Chronicon – history
- Clio-online – Internet Gateway for Historians
- CrossAsia – Virtual Library East and South-East Asia
- EconBiz – Virtual Library for Economics and Business Studies
- EVIFA – Virtual Library of Social Anthropology
- Fachportal Pädagogik – German Education Portal
- Genios – German Business Information
- Germanistik im Netz – Virtual Library of German Language and Literature Studies
- GetInfo – Specialist Information on Science and Technology
- Greenpilot – All About Life and Science
- historicum.net – history
- ilissAfrica (internet library sub-saharan Africa)
- IREON – International Relations and Area Studies Online
- MEDPILOT – All you need to know
- MENALIB – Middle East Virtual Library
- NedGuide – Virtual Library Dutch Culture
- Propylaeum – Virtual Library Classical Studies
- Psyndex – Reference Database of Psychological Literature and Tests
- Savifa – Virtual Library South Asia; Information gateway for South Asia Studies
- Slavistics Portal – Virtual Library Slavistics
- Sowiport – Social Sciences at your Fingertip
- SPORTIF – Sport-scientific information-forum
- ViFaArt – Virtual Library of Contemporary Art
- vifabio – Virtual Library of Biology
- ViFaHolz – Virtual Library of Wood Technology
- vifamath – Virtual Library of Mathematics
- ViFa medien buehne film – communication studies, media studies, journalism studies, theatre studies, film studies, journalism
- ViFaMusik – music
- vifanord – Virtual Library of Northern European and Baltic Studies
- ViFaOst – Virtual Library Eastern Europe
- ViFaPharm – Virtual Library of Pharmacy
- ViFaPhys – The Physics Virtual Library
- ViFaPol – political science
- ViFaPsy – Virtual Library of Psychology
- ViFa Recht – Virtual Library Law
- ViFa Romanischer Kulturkreis – Virtual Library of Romance Culture
- ViFa Sport – Sports science
- ViFaTec – Engineering Subject Gateway
- ViFaVet – Virtual Library of Veterinary Medicine and General Parasitology
- VirTheo – Virtual Library of Theology and Religious Studies
- VLib AAC – Virtual Library of Anglo-American Culture

=== vascoda-related projects ===
A number of projects and working groups focussing on certain aspects relevant to vascoda were financially supported by the German Research Foundation (DFG) or the Federal Ministry of Education and Research (BMBF). Various institutions were in charge of these projects. Some examples are:

- Functionality and operation of the vascoda portal
- Metadata, standards and questions of heterogeneity
- Coordination, marketing, quality assurance
- Content: rights, licences and business concepts
- Overall structures and tasks
- Shared authentication, authorization and permissions management
- Modelling and questions of heterogeneity

Currently, the German Research Foundation supports the vascoda 2010 project. The project aims at improving and furthering the vascoda portal.

== Bibliography ==
- vascoda – das interdisziplinäre Internetportal für wissenschaftliche Information. 10 Fragen von Bruno Bauer an Uwe Rosemann, Direktor der Technischen Informationsbibliothek Hannover und Sprecher des vascoda-Projekts. in: Medizin – Bibliothek – Information 2005; 5(3): 11–14 (Onlineversion pdf-Datei, 98 KB)
- Jens E. Wolff, Thomas Oerder: Das vascoda-Portal – barrierefreie Recherche in wissenschaftlichen Fachinformationen. (Proceedings of the 95. Deutscher Bibliothekartag, Dresden 2006). (Onlineversion pdf-datei, 934 KB)
- Philipp Mayr, Anne-Kathrin Walter: Zum Stand der Heterogenitätsbehandlung in vascoda: Bestandsaufnahme und Ausblick., in: Bibliothek & Information Deutschland (Hrsg.): 3. Leipziger Kongress für Information und Bibliothek, 19.–22. März 2007. Leipzig: Verlag Dinges & Frick. Preprint pdf (176Kb)
- Ralf Depping: vascoda.de and the system of the German virtual subject libraries. In: Prasad, A.R.D. & Madalli, D.P. (eds.): International Conference on Semantic Web and Digital Libraries (ICSD 2007), 21–23 February 2007: 304-314. (pdf file, 730 KB)
