= The Muslim Philanthropy Digital Library =

The Muslim Philanthropy Digital Library (MPDL) is an online project by the American University in Cairo's John D. Gerhart Center for Philanthropy and Civic Engagement and the Center of Excellence for the Middle East and Arab Cultures, AUC Library) and Indiana University (The Center on Philanthropy), that makes all forms of information on philanthropy available through original documents, reports, graphics, waqf registrations, as well as scholarly analysis in Muslim-majority countries and communities worldwide. Start-up funding for the library in Cairo was provided by The International Development Research Centre of Canada.

The material found in MPDL ranges from 1900 to the present, focusing on the diverse cultural, political and social factors influencing the practice of philanthropy as well as the significant contributions from across Muslim-majority countries to contemporary global philanthropic practice.

== The Digital Collection ==
The digital collection is being built up through active collaboration with relevant libraries, universities and research centers in order to exchange information and documentation and to provide Web-based links to related library collections.

=== Language ===
The collection is available English and Arabic, with more languages being added in the second phase of the project.

=== Types of Documents ===
The collection is amassing a variety of documents, including monographs, journals, statistics, essays, discourses, annual reports and historical sketches, in addition to any other texts of relevance.

=== Spatial Domain ===
The library holds documents pertaining to Muslim-majority countries and communities worldwide.

=== Temporal Domain ===
The content spans from 1900 to the present.

== Project Partners ==
=== The John D. Gerhart Center for Philanthropy & Civic Engagement ===
The Gerhart Center seeks to promote philanthropy and civic engagement in the Arab region by serving as a source of knowledge, a cultivator of partnerships, and a catalyst for innovation, community engagement and a heightened sense of citizenship and social responsibility.

=== AUC Library Center of Excellence for Middle Eastern and Arab Cultures ===
This Center, based in the American University in Cairo’s Library, is dedicated to support the interdisciplinary programs, and to embrace all disciplines in the humanities and the social sciences. It supports the curricula of Middle East Studies at the undergraduate and graduate levels, faculty, and scholars from the international academic community. It is intended to promote the study of the Middle East and Arab history, culture and heritage in a larger number of academic departments, and to facilitate the flow of information about them at the AUC, in the Egyptian and Arab world communities, and beyond.

=== The Center on Philanthropy at Indiana University, Indianapolis, USA ===
The Center on Philanthropy at Indiana University is a leading academic center dedicated to increasing the understanding of philanthropy and improving its practice through research, teaching, public service and public affairs. Founded in 1987, the Center is a part of the Indiana University School of Liberal Arts at Indiana University-Purdue University Indianapolis.

Today, the Center conducts research and academic programs related to philanthropy and nonprofit management. And The Fund Raising School is an international university-based education and training program for fundraisers.

== Collections ==
=== Bint al-Nil ===
The Bint al-Nil (Daughter of the Nile) is a women's organization founded by educator, journalist, and reformer Durriyyah Shafiq in 1948 to campaign for women's rights in Egypt. The Bint al-Nil journal collection has selected articles that provides a record of civic engagement and philanthropy within the Egyptian feminist community. The Bint al-Nil Journal is contributed by the Women and Memory to the MPDL, and the Women and Memory Forum holds the copyright to the Bint al-Nil collection.

=== Visual Exhibition ===
The Visual Exhibition collection archives the "January 25th Revolution: Philanthropy Within and Beyond Tahrir Square." It is a collection of pictures submitted by a group of photographers documenting Egypt's recent revolution. This Exhibition is similar to an initiative by the AUC to document Egypt's 21st Century Revolution.

=== Philanthropy Digital Library Documents ===
The Philanthropy Digital Library Documents collection includes documents covering the different aspects of philanthropic practices in the Muslim world.
