= Oklahoma State University Library Electronic Publishing Center =

The Oklahoma State University Library Electronic Publishing Center is located at 103 Oklahoma State University Library Annex Stillwater, Oklahoma, 74078, United States.

== Collections ==
The Electronic Publishing Center has four important digital collections online:

- Chronicles of Oklahoma;
- Indian Affairs: Laws and Treaties;
- The Proceedings of the Oklahoma Academy of Science;
- Speeches of Boone Pickens.
