= Cylinder (disambiguation) =

A cylinder is a basic curvilinear geometric shape.

Cylinder may also refer to:

- Cylinder (algebra), the Cartesian product of a set with its superset
- Cylinder (disk drive), a division of data in a disk drive
- Cylinder (engine), the space in which a piston travels in an engine
- Cylinder (firearms), the rotating part of a revolver containing multiple chambers
- Cylinder (gastropod), a subgenus of sea snails
- Cylinder (locomotive), the components that convert steam power into motion
- Cylinder (optometry)
- Cylinder, Iowa, a city in Palo Alto County, Iowa, United States
- Cylinder set, a natural basic set in product spaces
- Cylinder set measure, a way to generate a measure over product spaces
- Gas cylinder, a high-strength container for storing gases at high pressure
- Phonograph cylinder, the earliest commercial medium for recording and reproducing sound

== See also ==
- Cylindera, a genus of ground beetles
