= CrossAsia =

Web portal of the Specialised Information Service Asia

CrossAsia is an internet portal offering access to printed and electronic resources concerning Asian studies to individuals affiliated to a German institution which is part of the Blauer Leihverkehr (Blue Loan Service). CrossAsia is being created and supervised by the East Asia Department of Berlin State Library, until 2015 the responsible library for East- and Southeast Asia (6,25) within the special research collection programme of the German Research Foundation (Deutsche Forschungsgemeinschaft). Information is presented as well in Latin as in Asian script.
