= EGranary Digital Library =

The eGranary Digital Library is a product of the WiderNet Project, a non-profit aimed at providing access to information technology and library services in developing countries.

== History ==
In 2000 Cliff Missen and Michael McNulty founded WiderNet to "provide training and research in low-cost, high impact uses of information technologies in developing countries". Missen developed the idea after studying at the University of Jos in Jos, Plateau State, Nigeria, the year before as a Fulbright Scholar. While studying and teaching in Nigeria through the program, Missen experienced first-hand frustrations the lack of Internet access caused. This frustration led to his vision of the WiderNet project with the objective of providing training and research in low-cost, high-impact uses of information technologies in developing countries.

The WiderNet Project has shipped over 1,600 computers, 50,000 books, and more than 800 eGranary Digital Libraries to schools, clinics, and universities in Africa, India, Bangladesh, and Papua New Guinea since 2000. They have also trained almost 5,000 people on topics including policy planning, enterprise management, technician training, and classroom technology.

In 2001 Cliff Missen invented the eGranary Digital Library. There are now eGranary installations in more than 1,600 schools, clinics, and universities in Africa, India, Bangladesh, Papua New Guinea, and Haiti.

== Objective ==
An eGranary Digital Library caches educational resources via a local area network in order to reduce connectivity costs in Internet-scarce areas. Most eGranary subscribers do not have an Internet connection, but those who do can open resources up to 5,000 times faster from the eGranary Digital Library.

The eGranary Digital Library contains an off-line collection of approximately 35 million educational resources from more than 2,500 Web sites and hundreds of CD-ROMs and fits on an 8TB hard drive. The collection includes more than 60,000 books in their entirety, hundreds of full-text journals, and dozens of software applications.

Some of the documents in the eGranary Digital Library are in the public domain, some carry a copyleft license, but most of them have been provided by their authors and publishers as a contribution to global education. About 6% of the content in the eGranary Digital Library is not available on the public Internet; much of it typically requires a subscription or payment, but authors and publishers have agreed to provide it for free to people in low-bandwidth situations.

Any subscriber can include their own digital content in the eGranary Digital Library, making it a publishing platform for communication and collaboration.

== Included software ==
The eGranary Digital Library contains a built-in proxy server and search engine similar to the Internet at a speed that is otherwise not usually available to its users. The proxy server allows users' Web requests to "play-through" to the Internet if a connection is available.

Since many patrons of the eGranary Digital Library are unfamiliar with using the Internet, WiderNet Project hires librarians worldwide to assist partners in locating specific resources. The eGranary's interface includes a word search that Lucene and Solr power; an online public access catalog that VuFind funds, which contains over 60,000 records; and dozens of portals experts from around the world cooperatively develop.

Since 2010, the eGranary Digital Library includes interactive Web 2.0 features in its Community Information Platform. Thanks to a generous grant from the Intel Corporation in 2010, the Community Information Platform was developed to allow users to create and share their own content through technologies like built-in Web editors, LDAP security, Moodle, WordPress, MySQL, PHP, Drupal, and others. Subscribers can set up unlimited Web sites on their server and use free, built-in software to make Web pages, upload files and share local information with each other.

== Social contract ==
One of the guiding principles of the eGranary Digital Library is that the content must not be sold for profit. The WiderNet Project pledges this to authors and publishers when seeking their permission and each subscriber institution signs a license agreement stating that they will make the content freely available to their patrons via their local area networks.

To build its service, the WiderNet Project developed a business model aimed at covering ongoing program and development costs through grants, donations, sponsored training programs, and volunteers. The organization has raised and spent over $1,200,000 across 15 years to develop, field test, and promote the concept. Volunteers have provided more than 30,000 hours to assist with computer programming, collecting and organizing resources, creating portals and curriculum, and building and distributing libraries.

While grants and gifts fund the development of new features, subscribers buy eGranary drives at a highly subsidized rate, just enough to recover production costs without making a profit. Subscribers cover the costs of basic librarianship; the costs of the purchase, testing, and preparation of the equipment; the transaction costs (like marketing, licensing, and accounting); and the costs of providing on-going technical support and software updates.

Several value-added resellers integrate the eGranary Digital Library into their offerings. Additionally, young entrepreneurs in developing countries have joined the WiderNet Project's Field Associate program, offering on-site installation and training in their countries.

Since they incur no bandwidth costs, some subscribers share their eGranary via wireless networks to create free wireless public libraries, or knowledge spheres, in their communities.

== Contributors ==
The eGranary Digital Library represents the collective efforts of thousands of authors, publishers, programmers, librarians, instructors and students around the globe. Some of the many authors and publishers who have granted permission to distribute their works via the eGranary Digital Library include Wikipedia, the Khan Academy, TED, the Centers for Disease Control, Columbia University, Cornell University, MIT OpenCourseWare, UNESCO, the World Bank, the Hesperian Foundation, and the World Health Organization.

== Research ==
There are several research publications on the eGranary, mainly by two scholars and their colleagues, each representing different research foci. Cliff Missen and colleagues have written several articles focussing on the contribution of the eGranary to low-bandwidth settings, notably Africa. Their research includes an overview of how the eGranary can provide web pages and multimedia files to under-resourced areas and counter the challenges of low bandwidth, as well as be an experiment to create metadata through crowd cataloging.

Bonny Norton and colleagues at a rural community library in Uganda carry out another area of scholarly work on the eGranary. Their research discusses student and teacher library users’ identities in light of their use of the eGranary, which had been donated to the library. The eGranary gave the student users a new range of identities to choose from, and the identities of the students in charge of the eGranary evolved as they went from being newcomers to being expert users. The eGranary also opened up for future imagined identities, such as ones related to working with technology. Teachers were positive and developed their technological skills but also recognized some challenges.

== See also ==
- Computer technology for developing areas
- Creative Commons
- Open content
