= Wikilala =

Digital library in Turkey

- Official patch of Wikilala
- Website type: Digital library
- Available in: Ottoman Turkish, Turkish
- Headquarters: Istanbul, {{{location_country}}}
- Country of origin: Turkey
- Area served: Worldwide
- Founders: Sadi Özgür, Harun Tuncer
- Revenue: Institutional subscription
- Website: wikilala.com
- Registration: Yes
- Launched: 2019; 7 years ago
- Current status: Active

Wikilala, nicknamed Google of Ottoman Turkish, is a Turkish digital library of Ottoman Turkish textual materials. Wikilala, as of 2024 in its beta version, consists of more than 109,000 printed Ottoman Turkish texts, including over 45,000 newspapers, 32,000 journals, 4,000 books and 26,000 articles. Wikilala provides its users with full-text search using the Ottoman Turkish alphabet or Turkish alphabet.

As of April 2021, the website has received over 200,000 visitors from 107 countries since its launch in 2019.

== History ==
The project was started in 2019 by Sadi Özgür, lecturer of Department of History, Istanbul Aydın University in collaboration with Harun Tuncer. The library consists of a detailed account of Ottoman literature, social and cultural life, and political environment.

== Digitization ==
Document digitization means scanning at high resolution; already digitized files can be uploaded directly.

Once uploaded, documents are run through optical character recognition (OCR) to extract the text. The text is indexed, and the documents become searchable as Latin alphabet and Arabic texts.

== Other works ==
The Turkish dictionary titled el-Hazînetü'l-Azîziye fi'l-Lügati'l-Osmâniyye by Sir James Redhouse was lost for a time. It was discovered and digitized. Redhouse took twenty years to create that dictionary in 10 volumes.

== Recognition ==
Wikilala was awarded Innovative Initiative of the Year Award by the Turkish Ministry of Culture and Tourism in April 2021 for its role in preserving Ottoman history.
