= EuroDocs: Online Sources for European History =

EuroDocs: Online Sources for European History is a digital history portal that offers links to online facsimiles, transcriptions, and translations of European primary historical sources. The sponsoring organization is the Harold B. Lee Library at Brigham Young University, where it was begun in 1995 by Richard Hacken, European Studies Bibliographer.

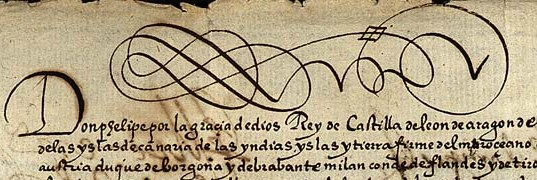
From a letter of Philip II, King of Spain

== Countries documented ==
The main page of EuroDocs points to 46 separate web indexes for countries and city-states of Europe,
as well as to sites for "Medieval and Renaissance Europe" and for “Europe as a Supranational Region”.

Countries include:

- Albania
- Andorra
- Austria
- Belarus
- Belgium
- Bosnia
- Bulgaria
- Croatia
- Cyprus
- Czech Republic
- Denmark
- England: See UK
- Estonia
- Finland
- France
- Germany
- Greece
- Hungary
- Iceland
- Ireland
- Italy
- Latvia
- Liechtenstein
- Lithuania
- Luxembourg
- Macedonia
- Malta
- Moldova
- Monaco
- Montenegro
- Netherlands
- Norway
- Poland
- Portugal
- Romania
- Russia
- San Marino
- Scotland: See UK
- Serbia
- Slovakia
- Slovenia
- Spain
- Sweden
- Switzerland
- Turkey
- Ukraine
- United Kingdom
- Vatican City

== Examples of primary sources ==
Most of the links are to external sources, but within the scope and linkage of EuroDocs are a number of digital treasures connected to the sponsoring institution, BYU.

Jesse Hurlbut of the French and Italian Department has assembled DScriptorium (“D” stands for “digital”), an online image collection of medieval manuscripts.

The page for Spain features facsimiles and transcriptions of previously unpublished, late fifteenth-century letters of King Philip II held in the L. Tom Perry Special Collections Library.

In cooperation with Centro Interuniversitario di Ricerche sul Viaggio in Italia, CIRVI, an international research center housed in Turin, Italy, and initially as part of a sister-city relationship between the 2002 and 2006 Winter Olympic venues, digitization of Accounts of American Travelers to Italy is ongoing – from Henry Adams to Washington Irving, from Harriet Beecher Stowe to Mark Twain.

Monaco's history – from a barren rock fortress protecting the marine interests of the Holy Roman Empire to a principality sheltering high rollers and billionaires – is being documented online with BYU efforts in league with European archives.

A number of EuroDocs pages point to the World War I Document Archive, a high-traffic attraction on the BYU Library server, among whose sources are found hundreds of transcribed Austro-Hungarian documents on the 1914 outbreak of war. The library was also fortunate to get ownership of complete copies of the original Eisenhower Communiqués, a collection of dispatches documenting the Allied advance across Europe after D-Day in 1944, so that these typescripts and their searchable transcriptions could become a part of the HBLL's digital collections.

== EuroDocs wiki features ==
The site has full search facilities through its MediaWiki interface.

Since the site is in a wiki structure historians, archivists, and other interested collaborators are welcome, by writing to the wikimaster, to add links to primary documents online or to transcribe and add important documents available to them.
