= Discus Awards =

U.S.-based national high school awards and recognition program

- Discus Awards logo
- Awarded for: Honoring the All-Around Student
- Country: USA
- First award: 2009 - Present
- Website: http://www.discusawards.com/

The Discus Awards is an American awards and recognition program for high school students. It was created in 2009 by Campus Direct and Recognition Media, the operator and owner of the Webby Awards.

Discus Award winners are eligible for a $2,000 scholarship. Ten $2,000 merit-based college scholarships are given out every school year.

U.S. high school students in 9th through 12th grades are eligible to win the award. Students may nominate themselves, or students may be nominated by others. To submit a nomination, students must select three of 10 attributes and write an article about each attribute. The 10 attributes are arts, athletics, academics, faith, government, green, community service, technology, work, and other. Nominations are judged on their three attributes by current or former teachers, guidance counselors or school administrators.
