= Discus (website) =

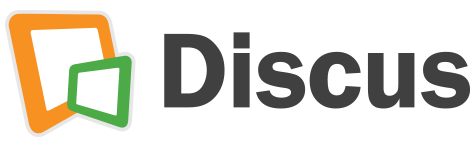
- Website type: Digital library
- Available in: English
- Owner: South Carolina State Library
- Website: www.scdiscus.org
- Registration: Registration is impossible; the site requires users to know the central login. Accessing most pages on the site requires the login, but most main pages of the site can be viewed whether logged in or not.
- Launched: October 26, 2001
- Current status: Active

Discus (sometimes stylized as DISCUS, also referred to as South Carolina's Virtual Library and SC Discus) is a free-of-charge digital library intended exclusively for residents of the U.S. state of South Carolina that is managed by the South Carolina State Library. The digital library aims to provide several reliable online resources. Discus is mainly intended for use in school and state libraries, but requires a login to be accessed elsewhere.
