= University of Michigan Library =

University library system

Coordinates: 42°16′34.3″N 83°44′17.2″W

- Location: Ann Arbor, Michigan
- Established: 1838 (188 years ago)
- Branch of: University of Michigan

Collection
- Size: 14,543,814 volumes (Ann Arbor Library) as of 2019–2020 with 16,025,996 volumes held by all university libraries

Other information
- Director: Lisa Carter
- Website: lib.umich.edu

The University of Michigan Library is the academic library system of the University of Michigan. The university's 38 constituent and affiliated libraries together make it the second largest research library by number of volumes in the United States.

As of 2019–20, the University Library contained more than 14,543,814 volumes, while all campus library systems combined held more than 16,025,996 volumes. As of the 2019–2020 fiscal year, the Library also held 221,979 serials, and over 4,239,355 annual visits.

Founded in 1838, the University Library is the university's main library and is housed in 12 buildings with more than 20 libraries, among the most significant of which are the Shapiro Undergraduate Library, Hatcher Graduate Library, Special Collections Library, and Taubman Health Sciences Library. However, several U-M libraries are independent of the University Library: the Bentley Historical Library, the William L. Clements Library, the Gerald R. Ford Library, the Kresge Business Administration Library at the Ross School of Business, and the Law Library at the University of Michigan Law School. The University Library is also separate from the libraries of the University of Michigan–Dearborn (Mardigian Library) and of the University of Michigan–Flint (Frances Willson Thompson Library).

The University of Michigan was the original home of the JSTOR database, which contains about 750,000 digitized pages from the entire pre-1990 backfile of ten journals of history and economics. In December 2004, the University of Michigan announced a book digitization program in collaboration with Google (known as Michigan Digitization Project), which is both revolutionary and controversial. Books scanned by Google are included in HathiTrust, a digital library created by a partnership of major research institutions. As of March 2014, the following collections had been digitized: Art, Architecture and Engineering Library; Bentley Historical Library; Buhr Building (large portions); Dentistry Library (portions); Fine Arts Library (large portions); Hatcher Graduate Library (large portions); Herbarium Library; Kresge Business Administration Library; Law Library (portions); Museums Library; Music Library (large portions); Shapiro Undergraduate Library (large portions); Special Collections Research Library (portions); Taubman Health Sciences Library (large portions).

Responding to restricted public funding and the rising costs of print materials, the library has launched significant new ventures that use digital technology to provide cost-effective and permanent alternatives to traditional print publication. The University Library is also an educational organization in its own right, offering a full range of courses, resources, support, and training for students, faculty, and researchers.

The University Librarian and Dean of Libraries is Lisa R. Carter, whose term began on May 1, 2023.

== History ==
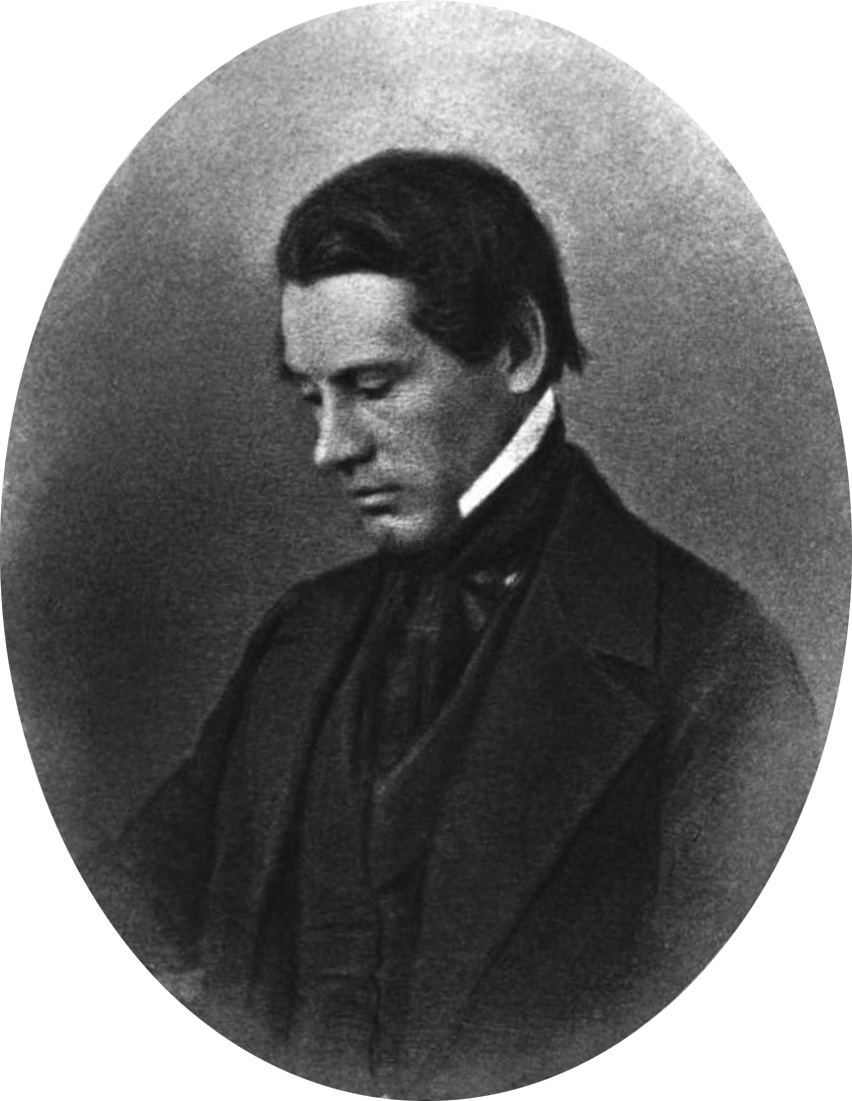
Asa Gray, the first professor of botany, was allocated $5,000 in 1838 to build the library's initial collection

The Michigan Legislature created the University of Michigan in Ann Arbor in 1838, and that year allocated funding for a library. The next year (three years before classes began), the Board of Regents of the University of Michigan acquired the University Library's first volume, John James Audubon's Birds of America, purchased at a cost of $970. (The book is now displayed in the Hatcher Gallery Exhibit Room). Also in 1838, the university's first professor, Asa Gray (known as the "father of American botany"), was entrusted with a $5,000 budget to establish the first collection of books for the University Library; he purchased 3,400 volumes.

Before the university's first years, books were stored in various places around campus, including at the Law School and in various professors' homes. In 1856, the North Wing of the University Building was remodeled, and books centralized in the university's Library and Museum there. In 1863, the Library moved to the Law Building. In 1883, with Raymond Cazallis Davis (chief librarian) as a motivating force in its completion, the university's first library building was finished. Within twelve years of its construction the building was already too small for the growing collection. Between 1870 and 1940 the collection grew rapidly, from 17,000 to 941,500.

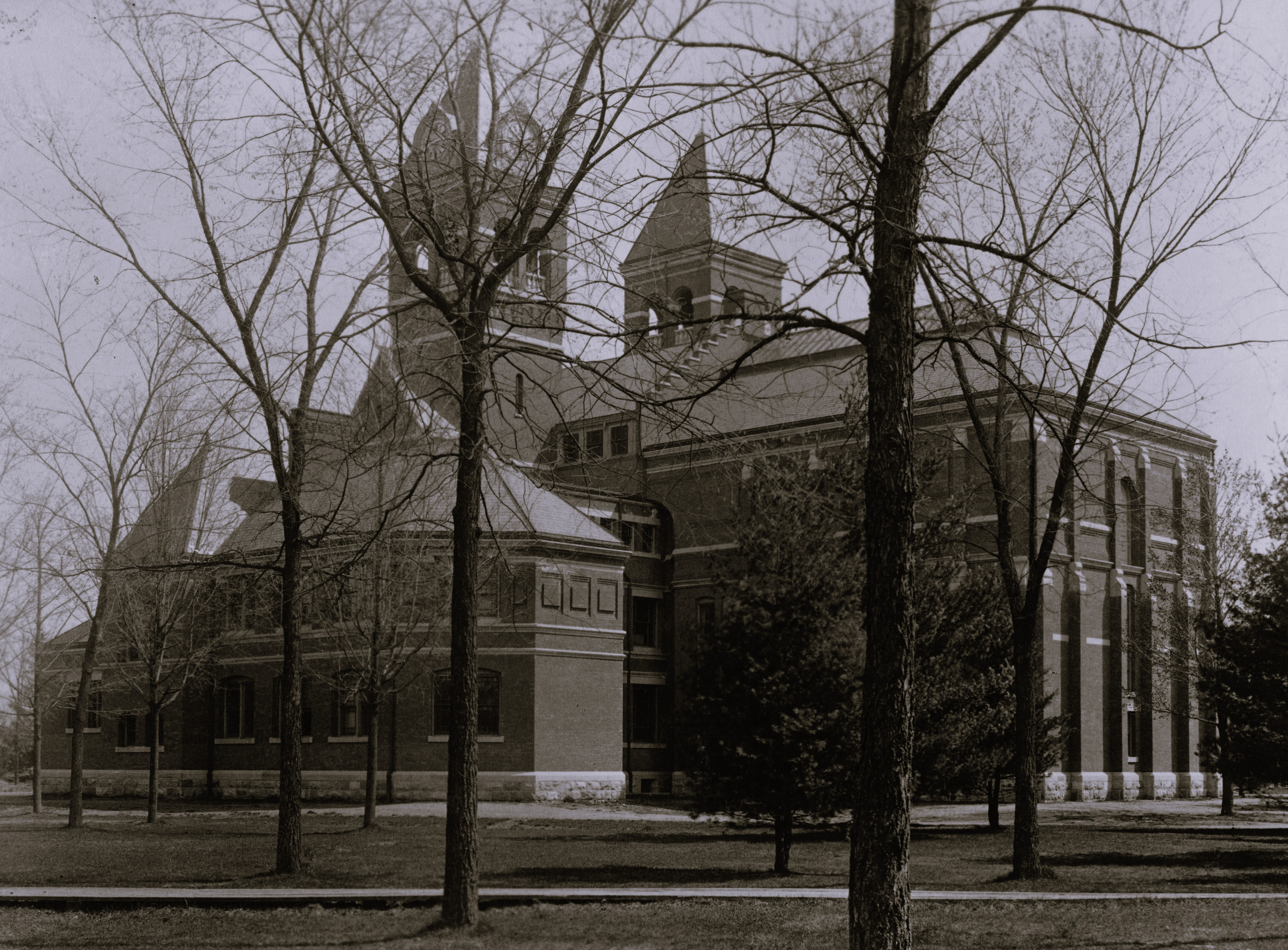
Old Library, designed by architects Ware and Van Brunt and completed in 1883. An addition was built to the south in 1898. The 1883 portion was torn down in 1918.

In 1890, the University Library inaugurated a handwritten card catalog system, which later changed to typed cards and, after 1900, to printed cards from the Library of Congress. By 1895, the Library's overcrowding problem had become acute, and President James Burrill Angell told the Regents that "The embarrassment, to which I have called attention in previous reports, arising from the crowded condition of the Library, of course grows more serious every year."

In 1900, the library established "caged areas in the stacks to protect books of exceptional value," becoming one of the first rare book rooms to be established in America. By 1905, student borrowing privileges had become established, a shift from the early restricted-circulation model in which students needed a faculty member's permission to check books out of the Library. In 1911, the Detroit anarchist Joseph Labadie donated his personal library to the university, establishing the nucleus of what became of the Labadie Collection, the oldest collection of radical-left history materials in the world.

By 1915, the overcrowded, wood-constructed General Library was designated a fire hazard by the Board of Regents. After this, a new building was finally constructed. Designed by architect Albert Kahn, the library building (which is today the north building of the Harlan Hatcher Graduate Library) was dedicated on January 7, 1920. The same year, Professor Francis W. Kelsey (who founded the university's Kelsey Museum of Archaeology) added 617 ancient Egyptian papyri to the university's holdings, beginning the University of Michigan Papyrus Collection, which became the largest in the Americas.

By 1940, the University Library's card catalog had 2,000 trays and 1.75 million cards. A post-World War II boom in enrollment, fueled by the G.I. Bill, further strained the library's crowding problems as the library continued to expand. In 1947, the library took over collection development responsibilities, replacing the old system in which each academic department selected and purchases books and journals. In 1948, the library established its Far Eastern Library (renamed the Asia Library in 1959) of materials from China, Japan, and Korea; the Asian Library is now the largest collection of East Asian resources in North America.

In 1970, an eight-story addition was built, where much of the print collections are housed, along with the Library's administration offices, the Map Library, Special Collections, and Papyrology. The Undergraduate Library was built in 1958, and renamed for Harold T. and Vivian B. Shapiro in 1995, with extensive access for students. In years to come, the principle of access to materials would become the standard and goal for all libraries and initiatives.

== Collections ==
=== Harlan Hatcher Graduate Library ===
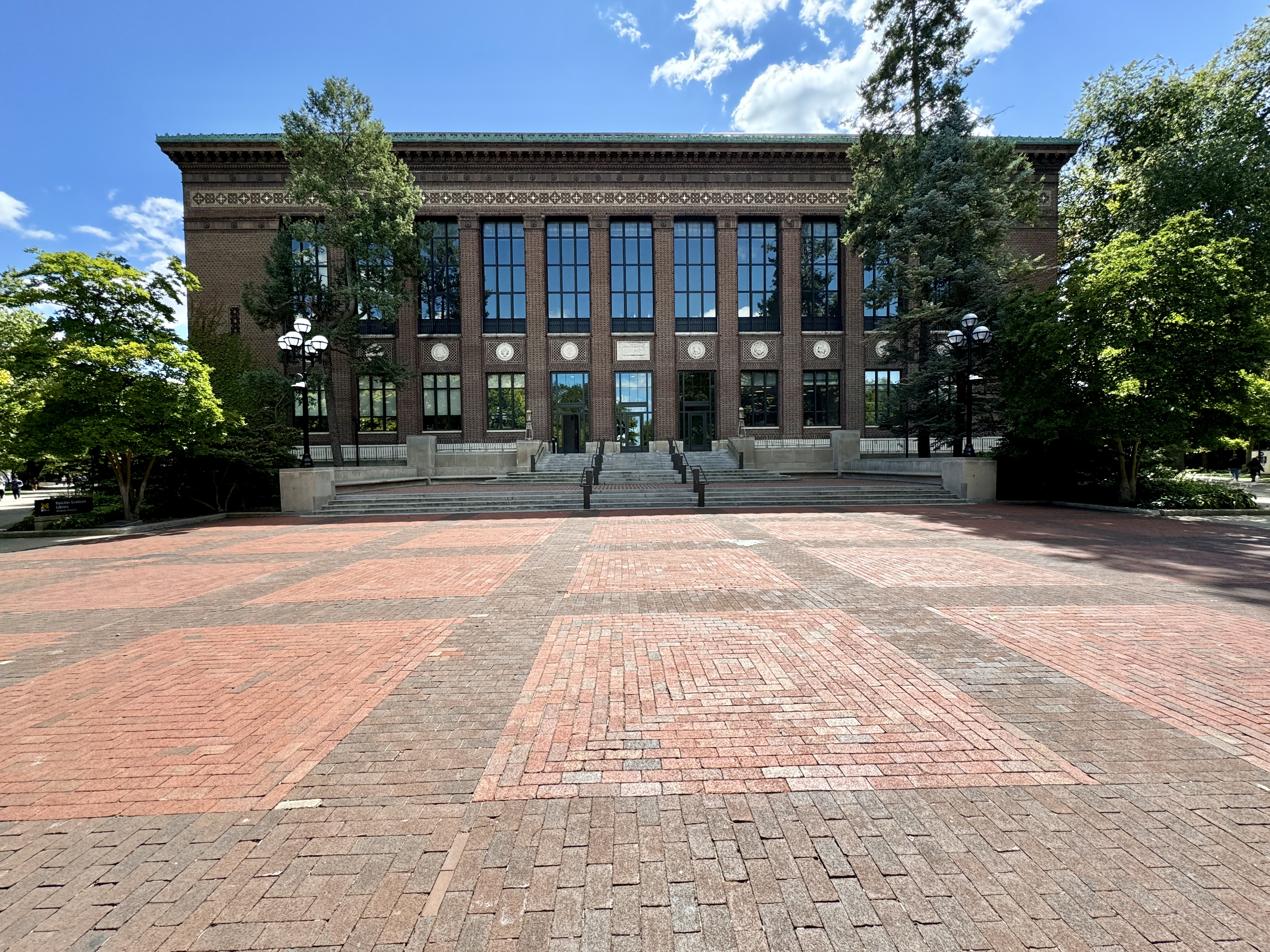
Hatcher Graduate Library viewed from the North

The Harlan Hatcher Graduate Library is the university's primary research collection for the humanities and social sciences. It contains over 3.5 million volumes and over 10,000 periodicals written in more than 300 languages. Commonly cited collecting strengths of the Graduate Library include English and French history, papyrology, Germanic history and culture, classical archeology, military history, English Literature, social and political movements. In addition, these general stacks collections are supported by strong holdings in United States and foreign government documents, a significant collection of maps and cartographic materials, a comprehensive collection of publications written in East Asian languages, manuscripts and special collections, over 1.5 million items in microformat, and a strong collection of reference and bibliographic sources. The library was named after Harlan Hatcher, the eighth President of the university.

A number of units are physically in the Hatcher Library or are organizationally associated with the Hatcher Library. These include:

==== Asia Library ====
The Asia Library is located on the fourth floor of Hatcher Graduate Library (North). It is one of the largest collections of East Asian materials in North America, as of June 2012 holds some 785,000 volumes of Chinese, Japanese, and Korean monographs, 2,100 currently received serials, and 80,000 titles of materials in microform, and a large number of electronic resources in all East Asian languages. The Asia Library also has a reference room with essential reference materials, such as encyclopedias, dictionaries, maps, bibliographies, and indexes, in both East Asian and Western languages. The Asia Library launched its own website in April 1994, making it one of the first multilingual websites on East Asian studies.

==== Stephen S. Clark Library ====
The Clark Library is the university's combined "map collection, government information center, and spatial and numeric data services" center. Its map collection is the largest in Michigan and one of the largest of any university, consisting of more than 370,000 maps and about 10,000 atlases and reference works. The map collection's holdings include a variety of cartographic materials, including maps, atlases, gazetteers, geographical dictionaries, and other reference works. Among the highlights of the collection are Abraham Ortelius's 1570 Americae sive novi Orbis, nova Descriptio, an early map of the Americas; Giambattista Nolli's 1798 Nuova Pianta di Roma, a map of Rome; Giovanni Battista Piranesi's 1746 Plan of the Course of the Tiber, a plan of the Tiber River commissioned by Pope Benedict XIV; an 1809 pocket globe, and Guillaume Coutans's 1880 Tableau Topographique des Environs de Paris.

The Clark Library Government Information Collection serves as a center for government documents. The university is a Federal Depository Library for U.S. government documents, and is also the a depository for publications of the State of Michigan, government of Canada, United Nations, Food and Agriculture Organization (FAO), and European Union. The university's collection of publications of the Organisation for Economic Co-operation and Development (OECD), World Bank, International Monetary Fund (IMF) and World Trade Organization (WTO) are also held at the Clark Library. Highlights of the Government Information Collection include a full run of all U.S. congressional publications since 1789, all UN documents since 1946, and all U.S. census documents since 1790.

The library's Spatial and Numeric Data Services (SAND) is housed at the Clark Library and on North Campus at SAND North in the Spatial Analysis Lab (room 2207) of the Art and Architecture Building. SAND assists in research, and "locates, acquires, and converts numeric and spatial data sets, especially social science data sets. SAND also supports the use of geographic information systems (GIS) software.

==== Special Collections Research Center ====
The Special Collections Research Center (SCRC) acquires, cares for, interprets, and shares collections of unique, rare, and primary source material. The space was renamed from the Special Collections Library to the Special Collections Research Center in 2018. The collection is non-circulating, with many materials stored off-site and retrieved upon request. The SCRC includes around 275,000 published volumes, as well as an estimated 6,500 linear feet of archival material, about 450 incunabula (pre-1501 books), and almost 1,400 early manuscripts on vellum and paper. The SCRC also includes an estimated 20,000 posters and prints and 10,000 photographs. Notable strengths of the Special Collections Research Center include:

- History of astronomy and mathematics – includes hundreds of pre-1800 publications, including works by Copernicus, Kepler, and Euclid. The Library owns an original Galileo manuscript, a gift of Tracy W. McGregor in 1938; the manuscript is a draft of a Galileo letter to Leonardo Donato, doge of Venice, around August 1609, mentioning his discovery of four moons of Jupiter.
- Children's literature – includes around 25,000 published volumes and a large amount of archival material "containing the artwork, correspondence, manuscripts, and other material created or collected by a number of notable authors and illustrators."
- Early manuscripts – includes over 250 medieval and Renaissance volumes, as well as individual leaves, many of religious topics. Among the most notable is a collection of 20 parchment leaves containing the works of Shenoute of Atripe. There is also a separate collection of around 1,250 Islamic manuscripts, written in Arabic, Persian, and Turkish and ranging from the 8th to the 20th centuries. This is considered "among the largest and most important such collections in North America."
- Heritage Edition of The Saint John's Bible – The Special Collections Research Center holds one of this rare reproductions, with calligraphy by Donald Jackson, on display on the sixth floor of the Hatcher Graduate Library.
- Janice Bluestein Longone Culinary Archive – This collection originated with the donation of the personal culinary history collection of Janice Bluestein Longone and her husband, Chemistry Professor Emeritus, Daniel T. Longone. It "brings together a diverse body of materials on the American culinary experience. Holdings cover the production, promotion, preparation, presentation, consumption, and appreciation of food and drink in America. Related aspects of domestic and commercial life are also included, such as entertaining and marketing...Particular strengths include 19th and early 20th century cookbooks, charity cookbooks, immigrant cookbooks, food-related advertising ephemera, and restaurant menus."
- Joseph A. Labadie Collection – "One of the oldest and most comprehensive collections of radical history in the United States," including materials on anarchism, labor movements, civil liberties, socialism, communism, colonialism and imperialism, American labor history, the Industrial Workers of the World, and the Spanish Civil War.
- Worcester Philippine History Collection – This collection includes a variety of published works, manuscripts, and photographs on the history of the Philippines. The core of the collection is the extensive collection of material donated by Dean Conant Worcester to the university (his alma mater) in 1914. The collection is particularly strong in the period from 1899 and 1913, when Worcester served as a member of the Philippine Commission and the Philippines was governed by the Bureau of Insular Affairs.
- Transportation History Collections – This collection includes "thousands of volumes on railroad history, roads and automobile travel, bicycling, bridges, Hot air ballooning, canals, and steamships." Highlights include the records of the Lincoln Highway Association, the Pierce-Arrow Motor Car Company, and the Detroit United Railway; the papers of Charles Ellet, Jr.; a 27-volume photographic journal documenting the building of the Panama Canal; and "extensive graphic material depicting pre-20th century transportation."
- Theater, Radio, Television, and Film – The Special Collections Research Center holds various pre-19th century plays in various languages, including "numerous works from the Spanish Golden Age; early English plays including hundreds of editions of the works of Shakespeare, beginning with his Second Folio (1632); over 1,000 plays performed in French 'boulevard' theatres early in the 20th century; and several archival collections documenting American vaudeville and the 'Little Theatre' movement of the early 20th century." More contemporary highlights include two collections of papers acquired from a collaborator and a partner of Orson Welles, covering Welles' career in theater, radio, and film, and an extensive archive on the life and career of film director Robert Altman.

==== Jewish Heritage Collection ====
The library's special collection on Jewish history and culture, from a gift made jointly to the Frankel Center for Judaic Studies and the University Library. Includes more than 1,500 books, 1,000 works of art (drawings, paintings, engravings, woodcuts, lithographs, and prints); 700 items of ephemera (cards, calendars, clippings, postcards, and mementoes); and some 200 objects, including both ritual objects (menorahs, groggers, yarmulkes, Challah covers, besamim) and other objects (toys, candles, serving trays).

==== International Studies ====
International Studies (formerly the Area Programs Library) consists of four divisions: Near East; Slavic, East European, and Eurasian; South Asia; and Southeast Asia Division.

- The Near East Division focuses on North Africa, Southwest Asia, Asia Minor, and Central Asia. As of 2013 the division had 597,507 monograph titles and 1,457 current serial titles. Represented are works in European languages (308,000 works), Arabic (174,427), Hebrew and Yiddish (55,477), Persian and Tajik (27,037), Turkish, Ottoman, or Turkic (32,136), and Kurdish (430).
- The Slavic, East European, and Eurasian Division focuses on Eastern Europe, Mongolia, modern Greece, and Russia and the post-Soviet states, including Transcaucasia and Central Asia. Notable holdings of the collection include: "Russian revolutionary movements, Russian and East European dissident writings, modern Armenian history and literature, rare books and archives focusing on the Silver Age of Russian literature, Southeast European travel literature, and serial publications of the East European academies." The division has some 600,000 items, including some 427,800 monographs, 3,900 current serials in vernacular languages; 405,000 titles in Western languages, and 16,500 non-print media items, including microform and electronic resources. There are 86 languages represented, with the best-represented being Russian (163,650 items), Serbo-Croatian (45,000 items), Polish (60,000); Czech and Slovak (30,000); Armenian (22,500 items); and Central Asian languages (15,800 items).
- University of Michigan Papyrology Collection

=== Shapiro Library ===
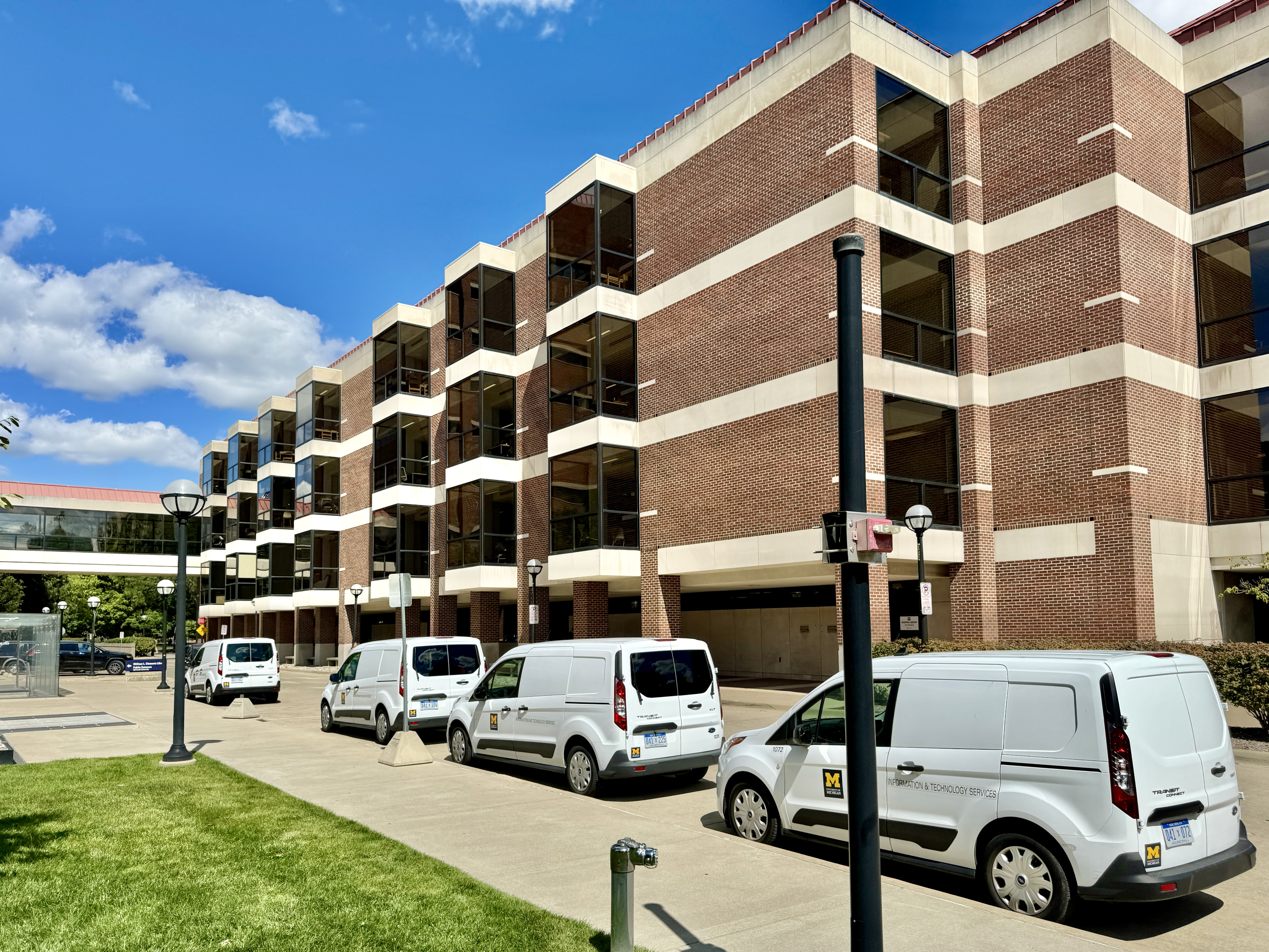
Harold T. and Vivian B. Shapiro Library

The Hatcher Graduate Library is connected by a skyway to the Shapiro Library Building, which houses two libraries:

- Shapiro Undergraduate Library (called "the UGLi," a pre-renovation nickname that stuck) includes all four floors of the Shapiro Library Building. It is a popular study and meeting place for U-M undergraduates, and has a solid, generalist collection of about 200,000 books and journals. The UGLi also offers a great many services to its students, including Course Reserves, Reference Services, and the Peer Information Consultant (PIC) program, which allows students to get research advice from fellow undergraduates. Café Shapiro is an annual forum for students, nominated by their professors, to read their creative work in a casual, coffeehouse-style environment. The UGLi is also home to Bert's Café, which opened in February 2008. The café was donated by Bertram Askwith (LSA '31), who is also the donor of the Askwith Media Library. The basement and fourth floor of Shapiro hold books on astronomy, biology, chemistry, geology, natural resources, mathematics, physics, and statistics. The Shapiro Library contains over 400,000 print volumes and subscribes to over 2,000 journals.
- Askwith Media Library, formerly the Film and Video Library, was renamed and moved to the second floor of the Shapiro Library Building. The Askwith Media Library contains over 25,000 titles, including feature films, documentaries, and instructional programs available for checkout, on-site viewing, or streaming. Especially strong in foreign, animated, and documentary film, Askwith serves the entertainment and instructional needs of the university community.

=== Other Central Campus libraries ===
The University Library contains collections that support the university's museums:

- The Fine Arts Library, located on the second floor of Tappan Hall (the History of Art building) serves the History of Art department, the University of Michigan Museum of Art, the Kelsey Museum of Archeology. It holds over 100,000 volumes on "history, theory, and criticism of the visual arts," including works on painting, drawing, sculpture, graphic arts, decorative arts, architectural history and photography.
- The Museums Library is located near South Campus in the Research Museums Center. It holds more than 130,000 cataloged volumes, with a focus on taxonomy, botany, zoology, behavioral biology, paleontology, and anthropology.
- The Herbarium Library collection is also housed in the Research Museums Center, in the University of Michigan Herbarium on Varsity Drive.

=== Taubman Health Sciences Library ===
One of the largest medical libraries in America with comprehensive collections in all facets of health care and medical research, the Taubman Health Sciences Library also has extensive online collections and is a member of the National Network of Libraries of Medicine, a gateway for access to over a thousand medical libraries nationwide. The Taubman Health Sciences Library has recently introduced the Clinical Librarian Service for the growing information needs of health professionals within the University of Michigan Health System who cannot easily leave their units, clinics or health centers.

Many rare volumes of significance to the history of medicine have been moved to the Special Collections Research Center, with access by appointment only. These include approximately 6,300 titles dating from 1470 to the early 20th century, consisting primarily of pre-1850 imprints. It includes 82 incunabula, 52 magical medical amulets, as well as medical fugitive sheets, manuscripts, letters, medical cartoons, medical portraits, medical illustrations, and medical artifacts. Particular strengths of the collection are early 19th-century American medical literature; anatomy; surgery; homeopathy; pharmacy and materia medica; obstetrics and gynecology; cardiology; pathology; and hernia treatment.

=== North Campus libraries ===
Two university libraries are located on the U-M North Campus: the Music Library and the Art, Architecture & Engineering Library (AAEL). The Music Library is located on the third floor of the Earl V. Moore Music Building. The Music Library's collections feature extensive materials in performance, musicology, composition, theory, and dance, including scores, serials, and sound and video recordings in many formats. The Art, Architecture & Engineering Library, in the Duderstadt Center, features more than 600,000 volumes, thousands of periodicals, and over 200 databases in the disciplines of art and design, architecture, engineering, and urban planning. The library has especially strong collections in early twentieth-century art and design, with many materials on the Bauhaus school, Le Corbusier, Louis Sullivan and Frank Lloyd Wright.

=== Independent libraries ===
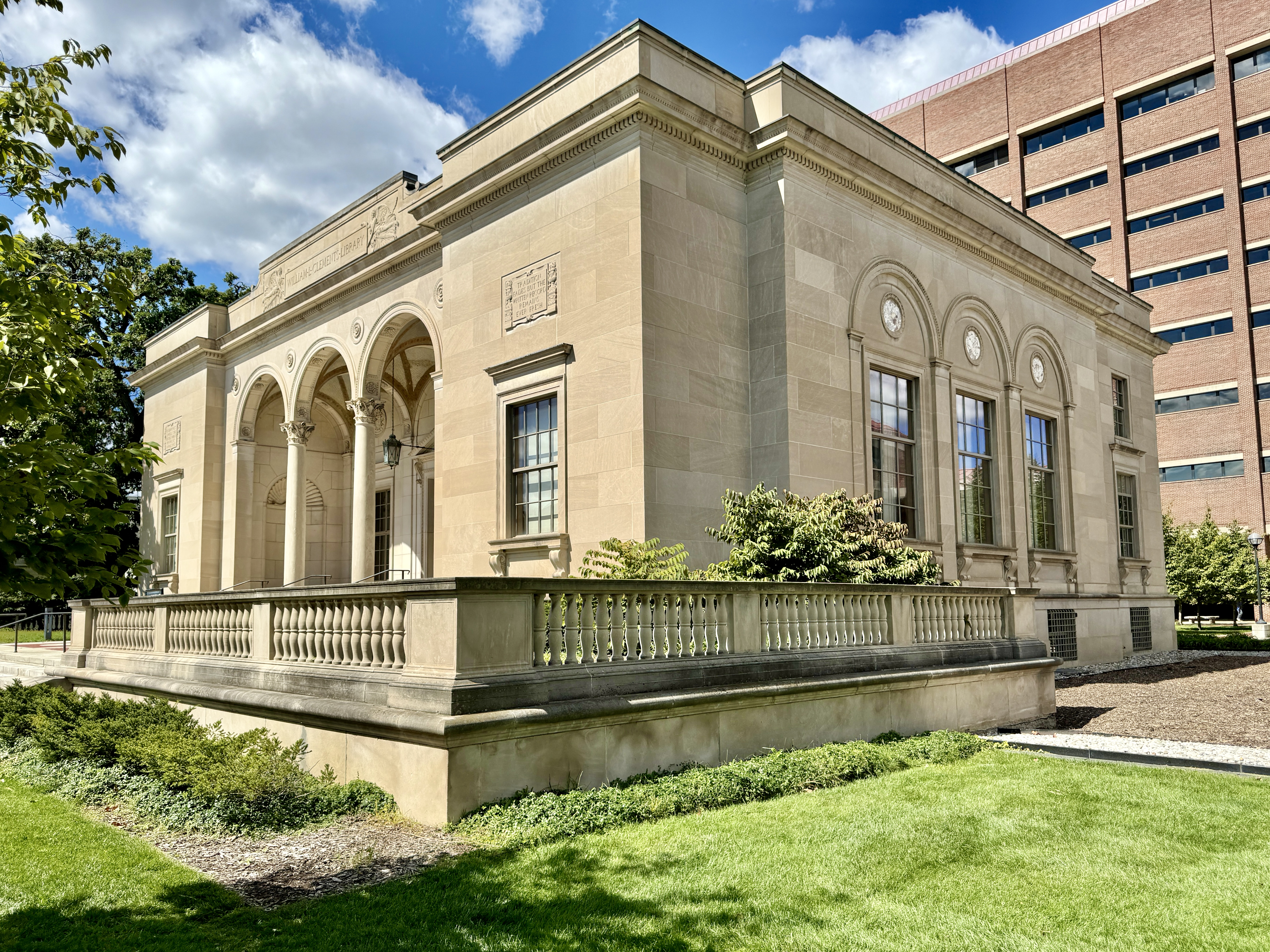
William L. Clements Library

There are also several collections that are affiliated with the university, but are not part of the University Library system. Two historical libraries are the Bentley Historical Library and the William L. Clements Library. The former is home of the University of Michigan's archives as well as the Michigan Historical Collections, while the latter houses original resources for the study of American history and culture from the 15th to the early 20th century.

Other libraries include the Law School Library, the Gerald R. Ford Presidential Library, the Ronald and Deborah Freedman Library of the Population Studies Center, and the Transportation Research Institute Library. The last library is one of the world's most extensive collections of literature on traffic safety. There are also many independent departmental libraries, as well as small libraries in many student dormitories.

=== Off-campus facilities ===
The only off-campus library in the University of Michigan system is the Biological Station Library. Its collection consists of over 16,000 cataloged volumes and more than 50 paper journals. It specializes in limnology, ornithology, ecology, systematics, taxonomy, and natural history. Located in Pellston, Michigan, near the northern tip of the Lower Peninsula of Michigan, the University of Michigan Biological Station is dedicated to education and research in field biology and environmental science.

While not considered an independent library, the Buhr Building serves as a preservation facility for the U-M library system. It houses over two million fragile or low-circulation items in a climate-controlled environment.

== Challenges and opportunities ==
=== Michigan Publishing ===
Michigan Publishing (formerly "MPublishing") is a library publishing initiative which is "the hub of scholarly publishing at the University of Michigan."

Major activities of Michigan Publishing include: "publishing monographs in print and electronic forms; hosting and publishing journals, with an emphasis on online, open-access formats; developing new digital publishing models with the potential to become community portals for wider knowledge sharing; creating permanent, accessible versions of faculty publications and related materials; publishing and copyright consultation and education; rights advocacy for University of Michigan authors; reissuing materials from our collections and our faculty in new forms (reprints, electronic editions)."

Michigan Publishing hosts and helps operated 25 University of Michigan-based journals and scholarly conference proceedings in a variety of fields. It also operates Deep Blue, the university's institutional repository.

Michigan Publishing operates several print-on-demand programs. The University of Michigan Faculty Reprints (FRS) returns out-of-print books written by university faculty back into circulation on an openly accessible and affordable basis, both online and in print. The library also has an Espresso Book Machine on the first floor of the Shapiro Undergraduate Library.

The University of Michigan Press is a component of Michigan Publishing.

==== Scholarly Publishing Office ====
The Scholarly Publishing Office (SPO) was founded by Maria Bonn as a unit of the University of Michigan Library devoted to developing innovative and economically sustainable publishing and distribution models for scholarly discourse. Its staff, services, and imprints are now part of Michigan Publishing. Created in 2001, the Scholarly Publishing Office provided a suite of publishing services to scholars at U-M and beyond, in order to provide alternatives to commercial academic publishing. In addition to developing cost-effective methods of publication, SPO also helped scholars increase access to their work by making it openly available online, within a trusted and durable digital library environment. Library-based publishing services such as those offered by the Scholarly Publishing Office contribute to a more robust, efficient, and diverse system of scholarly communication. In 2009 it was absorbed into a new brand name, "MPublishing", was in turn renamed to "Michigan Publishing" in 2013.

===== Background =====
SPO was unique among publishers because of its affiliation with a major university library. Historically, libraries have defined their mission according to the rubrics of collecting, preserving, cataloging, and distributing the fruits of scholarly inquiry. For many years this broadly conceived mission has sufficed; today, the economics of the publishing world have created a situation in which the status quo is impossible to maintain. Library budgets for public universities like the U-M are either cut or stagnant, while the costs of publishing in print form continue to rise. Publishing conglomerates drive subscription rates up, while libraries struggle—and in many case fail—to keep up. Smaller academic publishing houses do not generate sufficient revenue to support themselves, and their institutional subsidies have been slashed. Many presses have closed, and those that remain have raised prices for their books to a near-prohibitive level, further restricting sales.

Harnessing the flexibility and relatively inexpensive resources of electronic publishing, SPO responded to the economic challenges of scholarly publication by providing a cost-effective, sustainable, permanent, and user-friendly publishing option for journals that could not sustain the cost of print publication and distribution.

===== Projects and Publications =====
Starting with Philosopher's Imprint, a peer-reviewed journal produced by the University of Michigan Department of Philosophy, SPO published over a dozen journals and provided for-fee hosting for non-profit academic organizations' subscription products. For example, SPO hosted the American Council of Learned Society's ACLS Humanities Ebook (now hosted by Michigan Publishing) and the Law Library Microfilm Consortium's LLMC-Digital, a database of legal research materials. SPO also offered limited monograph publication and a print on demand service, as well as offering non-traditional publication services, such as online versions of exhibits curated by the University of Michigan's Special Collections Library.

SPO began a collaboration with the University of Michigan Press, called the Michigan Digital Publishing Initiative, to explore the possibilities of new publishing partnerships between libraries and traditional, print-based academic presses. The first fruits of this alliance was digitalculturebooks, an imprint that offers books on the role of technology in contemporary society in both print and digital formats.

SPO actively pursued new and promising partnerships and publication opportunities. For example, it released the online publication of the Bulletin of the American Society of Papyrologists (BASP), in partnership with the University of Michigan Library's Papyrology Collection. BASP is the only journal in the field of papyrology published in North America and is the official journal of the American Society of Papyrologists.

=== Digitization ===
Since the early 1990s, the University of Michigan Library has been a leader among research libraries in efforts to digitize its vast collections. The Digital Library Production Service (DLPS) of the U-M Library oversees the digitization of Library materials, and the development of online access systems for these digitized materials. In furtherance of this goal, DLPS developed its own digital library software, called Digital Library Extension Service (DLXS), that provides a uniform interface for its digitized items. DLPS oversees the scanning and optical character recognition of about 5,000 texts per year, many of them rare, brittle, or delicate.

The Digital Library Production Service hosts many searchable digital collections. Among them are:

- The Corpus of Middle English Prose and Verse, a collection of 54 Middle English texts variously digitized for the project by the university's Humanities Text Initiative and collected from University of Michigan faculty and texts provided by the Oxford Text Archive.
- The University of Michigan Historical Mathematics Collection, a collection of works of mathematics published in the 19th and early 20th centuries.
- Advanced Papyrological Information System (APIS UM)
- American Verse Project
- Making of America
- Michigan County Histories and Atlases
- Middle English Compendium

DLPS is also affiliated with the Text Creation Partnership (TCP) to create searchable, full-text versions of works digitized in the Early English Books Online, Evans Early American Imprints, and the Eighteenth Century Collection Online projects. TCP, when its work is concluded, will have produced over 40,000 XML-encoded text files—making it one of the largest collections of its kind.

=== Google and HathiTrust ===
In December 2004 the University Library and Google announced their plans to digitize the over 7 million print volumes held by the Library. Especially old and fragile items, or items in special collections, will not be handled by Google; these the Library will scan itself. It is estimated that it will take approximately six years for Google to complete the scanning process; without Google, the U-M Library was on pace to have their entire collection scanned in about 1000 years. All costs for the project are borne by Google, and the company has developed special scanning technology to ensure that the books are not damaged during the process. All books that are out of copyright will be available for the public to read online; those still in copyright will be searchable, but only brief excerpts will be available to read. Copyright holders, such as publishers and authors, who do not want their books to be scanned can request to have their works excluded from the project, though the Library and Google both maintain that authors and publishers benefit from having their works digitized, since it will make them easier to find and will potentially bring more sales.

Though the project has been revolutionary, it is not without controversy. In September 2005 a lawsuit was filed against Google charging copyright infringement. The lawsuit is still pending, but the scanning goes on.

On June 6, 2007, twelve universities cooperating as the Committee on Institutional Cooperation (CIC) announced a new partnership with Google whose explicit goal was to offer a public, shared digital repository of all the open access content. That shared repository of library partners became HathiTrust. The University of Michigan, which developed the MBooks platform for its own digitized books, partnered with Indiana University and the CIC libraries and the University of California system to create governance and models for financial support. The partnership has grown to include more than 60 institutions.

== ARL rankings ==
Using a variety of metrics such as accessibility, materials expenditures, volumes held, and staff size, the Association for Research Libraries (ARL) has consistently ranked the UM library system among the top ten in the nation. Although Michigan ranks 3rd among academic libraries as to total volumes held, it ranks 1st for unique titles held among all institutions reporting that statistic. The ARL data is now behind a paywall, but a university page notes that the current volume count posted to the ARL site is the count contained in the infobox: approaching 13 million volumes as of 2012–2013. Financial support has grown to roughly $58 million per annum.

Year	Volumes Held	Volumes Added Gross	Current Series	Total Expenditures	Total Staff	Data Source	Investment Index Rank
2013	13,250,648			$69,763,323	669	University of Michigan	
2009	9,575,256	176,363	70,047	$53,134,323	584	ARL	5
2008	9,175,102	146,729	69,457	$51,599,110	570	ARL	8
2007	8,414,070	157,552	71,788	$50,591,407	585	ARL	8
2006	8,273,050	176,998	134,446	$49,053,402	574	ARL	8
2005	8,133,917	189,373	124,809	$47,113,239	473	ARL	5
2004	7,958,145	171,154	67,554	$46,737,671	475	ARL	8
2003	7,800,389	173,081	74,664	$48,193,379	497	ARL	5
2002	7,643,203	182,670	69,218	$43,357,616	514	ARL	6
2001	7,484,343	172,287	68,684	$43,558,787	501	ARL	6
2000	7,348,360	179,392	68,798	$41,368,972	459	1.06	6
