= Readme.cc =

Readme.cc, supported by the European Commission, is a web 2.0 Internet portal for books and readers. It is currently available in ten languages. Following years of development Readme.cc was published on-line in the spring of 2008.

== History ==
The idea for the virtual library was developed within a project which took place in 2002 at the Collegium Helveticum at the Swiss Federal Institute of Technology (ETH Zurich) in collaboration with that year's visiting writer Walter Grond. Initially Grond and the literary critic and networker Beat Mazenauer intended to launch a blog in German where authors and critics would be able to recommend books by writing short reviews. In August 2006 the European Commission funded a three-year development programme for readme.cc. Within the framework of the Programme Culture 2000. The goal was to become "The European Forum for Readers". Grond and Mazenauer were joined by the multimedia experts Andreas Kohli and Martin Roth. The two had successfully developed technology for Expo.02. They suggested the creation of an Internet platform that would allow users to set up their own libraries. This transformed the literary experiment into a Web project and interactive interface for the public.

== Awards ==
- Prix Ars Electronica 2008 Honorary Mention in the category Digital Communities.
- Best Practice: recognised as an exemplary project by the Austrian Ministry for Education, Art and Culture 2007.
