= South Carolina State Library =

Official State Library of South Carolina

Coordinates: 34°00′04″N 81°01′39″W

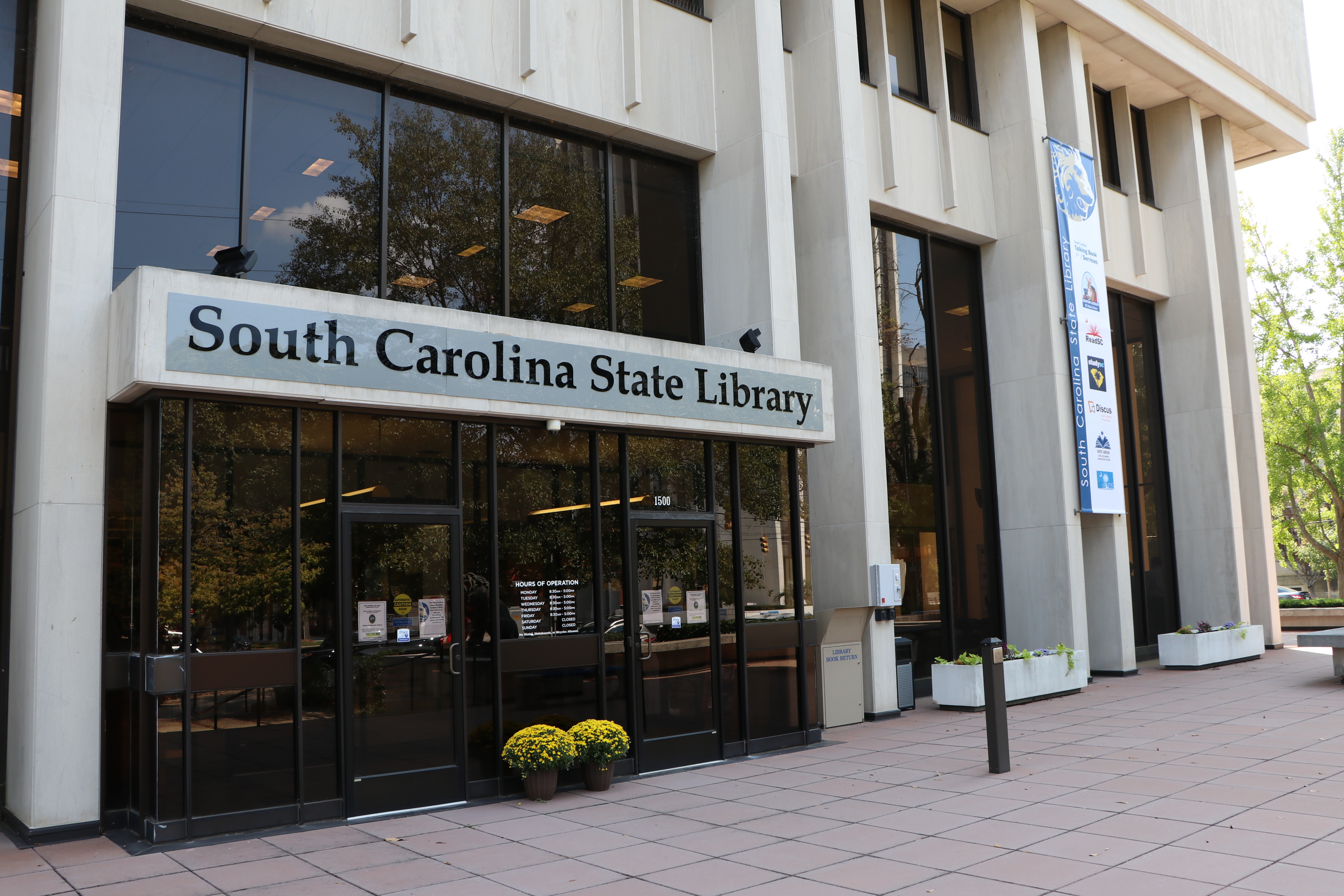

Agency overview
- Formed: 1929
- Jurisdiction: State of South Carolina
- Headquarters: 1500 Senate Street; Columbia, SC
- Agency executive: Leesa Aiken, Director
- Website: www.statelibrary.sc.gov

The South Carolina State Library (SCSL) is the official State Library of South Carolina located in Columbia, South Carolina. It is both a library and a state agency. The SCSL manages public library development, federal and state funding for libraries, service for print-disabled and physically handicapped patrons, library service for state institutions, and library service to state government agencies.

== History ==
In 1929 the South Carolina Legislature created the State Public Library Association and the State Library Board in order to establish statewide library services. Using grants, field agents were hired to assist communities that wanted to start libraries. Between 1935 and 1943 the Works Progress Administration created the South Carolina Library Project which helped establish at least some library service in all of South Carolina's counties. The State Library Board inherited the library assets of the WPA and received its first appropriation of state funding in 1943.

== Building ==
The current State Library building at 1500 Senate Street was constructed between 1969 and 1970. 1969 was when the existing State Library Board was redesignated as the South Carolina State Library and funds were made available for the construction of the building. It was dedicated on February 18, 1970. This building houses the general collections, public-facing staff, Talking Book Services and other administrative departments. The building was listed on the National Register of Historic Places in 2022.

== See also ==
- List of libraries in the United States
