= Noolaham Foundation =

Noolaham Foundation is a non-profit, charitable organization founded to provide enhanced access to information sources and foster knowledge-based development in Sri Lanka. It is a registered organization (GA 2390) based in Sri Lanka with volunteer participation from all over the world. Noolaham Foundation was initiated as Project Noolaham in 2005. In 2010, it was formally incorporated in Sri Lanka.

Noolaham Foundation was created with a view to documenting, preserving and disseminating texts and sources that speak about the social, economic, cultural and political discourses related to the Sri Lankan Tamil speaking communities. In the post-independence Sri Lanka, sites of knowledge production and knowledge preservation of the Tamil speaking communities such as the Jaffna Public Library has been lost. Therefore, it is important that we create alternative, virtual platforms where this knowledge could be preserved. Such platforms can also cater to the needs of local and international researchers who are interested in studying the various aspects of the Sri Lankan Tamil speaking communities. Noolaham Foundation is one such platform.

== Programs ==
The Foundation runs programs and projects including

- Research based documentation projects
- Digital preservation initiatives
- Digital library, virtual learning support and other information services
- Awareness raising related to information literacy, knowledge management, digital preservation, open access etc.

== Achievements ==
- Digitized over 55,000 documents related to Sri Lankan Tamil communities.
- Created a vast digital library (www.noolaham.org) with special collections such as Muslim Archive and Malaiyaham Archive
- Digitized collections of various individuals and institutions such as Jaffna Hindu College, Colombo Royal College and Vembadi Girls’ High School
- Digitized 24 sets of rare palm leaf manuscripts.
- Created a virtual learning platform for school students with thousands of resources (www.epallikoodam.org)
- Conducted the first Tamil Documentation Conference and many other seminars and workshops on documentation, digitization etc.
- Collected data-sets about people, places and institutions (3,000+ entries)
