= Craven Langstroth Betts =

Canadian poet and author

Craven Langstroth Betts (April 23, 1853–1941) was a Canadian poet and author.

== Life and work ==
Betts was born in Saint John, New Brunswick, to Sarah Ann (née Purdy) and Hiram Betts. The family traced their descent from the United Empire Loyalists. Betts was educated in Canada and in 1879 moved to New York to engage in business and to study literature.

Betts was a friend and patron of the American poet Edwin Arlington Robinson and served as his "banker", cashing cheques that came from the dwindling Robinson estate at Maine, as well as lending him small sums of money. The two men were frequent drinking and dining companions, and in the summers of 1900 and 1901, lived together at Betts's house in Manhattan whilst his mother and aunt were away in cooler climes. Their friendship lasted throughout Robinson's life and the latter's eventual success led him to more than repay Betts's financial support when he presented Betts with original manuscripts to sell, and left him $1,000 in his will.

While he published in other formats — he co-authored a collection of "social satire" in prose with Arthur Wentworth Hamilton Eaton and wrote the lyrics for at least one madrigal — the majority of Betts's literary output was poetry. His main publications are available electronically from various open access repositories (see below).

== Bibliography ==
- Béranger, Pierre-Jean de. Songs from Beranger. Translated in the original metres by Craven Langstroth Betts. New York: F.A. Stokes & Brother, 1888.
- The perfume holder; a Persian love poem, 1891.
- With Arthur Wentworth Hamilton Eaton. Tales of a Garrison Town. New York/St. Paul: D.D. Merrill, 1892.
- A garland of sonnets: in praise of the poets. New York: M.F. Mansfield and A. Wessels, 1899.
- The promise, a Greek idyl. New York: Monarch Press, 1910 [i.e. c1911].
- Selected poems of Craven Langstroth Betts. New York: Associated Authors and Compilers, 1916.
- The Two Captains. At Longwood. At Trafalgar. New York, A.A. Watts Co., 1921.
- The perfume holder and other poems. New York: James T. White, 1922.

=== Etexts ===
- "Defence of the Long Saut" (HathiTrust)
- "Don Quixote" (Bartleby.com)
- A garland of sonnets: in praise of the poets, 1899. (Canadiana.org)
- The perfume holder; a Persian love poem, 1891. (HathiTrust)
- The perfume holder and other poems, 1922. (HathiTrust)
- Selected poems of Craven Langstroth Betts, 1916. (Internet Archive)
- Songs from Beranger, 1888. (Canadiana.org)
- Tales of a Garrison Town, 1892. (Canadiana.org)
- "To the Moonflower" (Bartleby.com)
- The Two Captains, 1921. (HathiTrust)
