= Arthur Wentworth Hamilton Eaton =

Clergyman and writer (1849–1937)

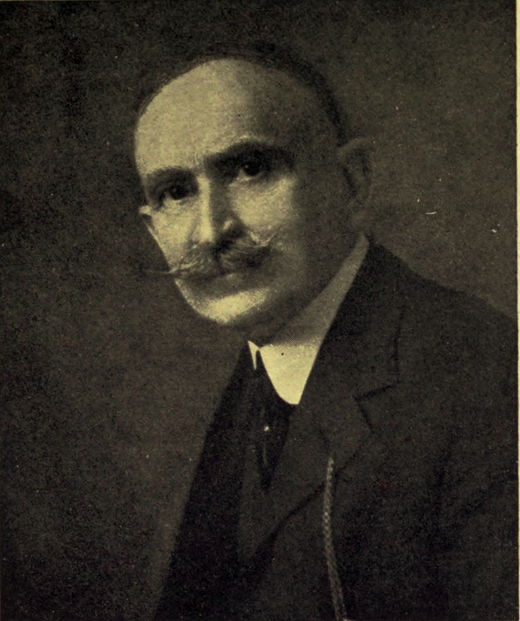
- Eaton in 1916
- Born: Arthur Wentworth Eaton; 10 December 1849; Kentville, Nova Scotia
- Died: 11 July 1937 (aged 87); Boston, Massachusetts, U.S.
- Occupations: Clergyman; educator; scholar; writer
- Notable work: The History of Kings County, Nova Scotia

Arthur Wentworth Hamilton Eaton (10 December 1849 – 11 July 1937) was a Protestant Episcopal clergyman, educator, and writer known for his historical and literary contributions. Born in Nova Scotia, Eaton moved to New England in his early 20s, studying at the Newton Theological Institution and Harvard University. He was head of the English faculty at Cutler School of New York until 1907, and wrote extensively on historical and genealogical topics across his career. The History of Kings County, Nova Scotia is regarded as his most substantial work.

== Background ==
Arthur Wentworth Eaton (Note: Eaton added "Hamilton" to his name later in his life.) was born on 10 December 1849 in Kentville, Nova Scotia, to parents William Eaton and Anna Augusta Willoughby Hamilton. His father was a teacher, and a devout Baptist, while his mother was an Anglican. According to Eaton's own account, he "received his early classical and general training in the grammar schools of Kentville, from his father at home, and for a short time in the College [Acadia] and Academy [Horton] at Wolfville." During Eaton's time in Kentville, he attended St James' Church.

== Early career ==
A descendent of New England Planters through his father and American loyalists through his mother, Eaton moved to New England in the summer of 1873. He studied at the Newton Theological Institution, a Baptist seminary in Massachusetts, graduating in 1876. He subsequently became ordained as a priest, spending a short time at a church in Maine. He later joined his younger brother Francis Herbert at Harvard University, where he earned a Bachelor of Arts in 1880. (Note: Eaton was in the same graduating class as Theodore Roosevelt.) He began a doctoral program at the university, but later withdrew.

After withdrawing from Harvard, Eaton joined the ministry of the Protestant Episcopal Church. He was ordained as a deacon of the church in 1884, and a priest in 1885. Eaton's career as a pastor was short-lived, briefly serving parishes in New York City and Massachusetts, including the parish of Chestnut Hill near Boston,

== Academic career ==
Eaton became employed at the Cutler School of New York in 1888 as a member of the English faculty, later becoming head of the school's English department. His first notable work was published the same year, titled The Heart of the Creeds: Historical Religion in the Light of Modern Thought. His first book of poetry was published a year later in 1889, titled Acadian Legends and Lyrics. (Note: Some poems from Acadian Legends and Lyrics were reprinted in Acadian Ballads, and De Soto's Last Dream in 1905.) The book was quite well-received. Eaton's third book, The Church of England in Nova Scotia and the Tory Clergy of the Revolution, was published in 1891. In 1904, Eaton received a Bachelor of Arts degree ad eundem from Dalhousie University. He received a Master of Arts from Dalhousie by thesis (Note: Eaton's Master of Arts thesis is titled The New York loyalists in Nova Scotia.) the same year. Eaton retired as head of the Cutler School's English faculty in 1907 and settled in Boston, where he continued researching and writing about the history of Nova Scotia.

Published in 1910, The History of Kings County, Nova Scotia is regarded as Eaton's magnum opus. At 900 pages long, the book was Eaton's most significant historical work.

Eaton was elected as a Fellow of the Royal Society of Canada in 1913. Members of the Royal Society were required to live in Canada, so Eaton returned to Nova Scotia and briefly settled in Truro. Here, he began compiling a history of Colchester County. Eaton resigned from the Royal Society of Canada after the society refused to publish the paper he presented at their annual meeting in May 1914.

== Later life and death ==
Eaton suffered a paralytic stroke in 1929. His final notable publication was Acadian Ballads and Lyrics in Many Moods: Collected Poems of Arthur Wentworth Hamilton Eaton, dedicated to his distant cousin Cyrus Stephen Eaton. Eaton died in Boston on 11 July 1937, at the age of 87. He never married. Eaton's ashes were returned to Kentville, where a monument was erected in his memory at the Oak Grove Cemetery.

== Publications ==
=== Books ===
- — (1888). The Heart of the Creeds: Historical Religion in the Light of Modern Thought. New York and London: G.P. Putnam's Sons. LCCN 20010841.
- — (1889). Acadian Legends and Lyrics. New York and London: White & Allen. LCCN 21008329.
- — (1890). Letter-writing: its ethics and etiquette, with remarks on the proper use of monograms, crests and seals. New York: F. A. Stokes Company. LCCN 10002415.
- — (1891). The Church of England in Nova Scotia and the Tory Clergy of the Revolution. New York: Thomas Whittaker. LCCN 07041464.
- — (1892). College requirements in English entrance examinations. Boston: Ginn & Company. LCCN 12013389.
- —; Betts, Craven Langstroth (1892). Tales of a Garrison Town. New York: D. D. Merrill Company. LCCN 06036814.
- — (1899). Lt.-Col. Otho Hamilton of Olivestob. Halifax, NS: Press of J. R. Findlay. LCCN 20011928.
- — (1900). Funny Epitaphs. Boston: Mutual Book Company. OCLC 3779931.
- — (1905). Acadian Ballads, and De Soto's Last Dream. New York: Thomas Whittaker. LCCN ltf96010662.
- — (1905). Poems of the Christian Year. New York: [s.n.] LCCN ltf91093846.
- — (1907). The Lotus of the Nile and Other Poems. New York: Thomas Whittaker. LCCN 07000504.
- — (1910). The History of Kings County, Nova Scotia. Salem, Mass.: The Salem Press Company. LCCN 10025852. (Note: History of Kings County, Nova Scotia was reprinted in 1972 by Mika Publishing Company of Belleville, Ontario. ISBN 978-0-9193-0249-5)
- — (1914). The Famous Mather Byles, the Noted Boston Tory Preacher, Poet, and Wit, 1707-1788. Boston: W. A. Butterfield.
- — (1930). Acadian Ballads and Lyrics in Many Moods: Collected Poems of Arthur Wentworth Hamilton Eaton. Toronto: McClelland & Stewart. LCCN 30007745.

=== Books as editor ===
- Pope, Alexander (1901). Eaton, Arthur Wentworth Hamilton (ed.). The Rape of the Lock. New York and Boston: Silver, Burdett and Company. LCCN 01031045.
- Lichtenstein Johnston, Elizabeth (1901). Eaton, Arthur Wentworth Hamilton (ed.). Recollections of a Georgia Loyalist. New York and London: M. F. Mansfield. LCCN 76187388.
- Longfellow, Henry Wadsworth (1914). Evangeline. Introduction by Arthur Wentworth Hamilton Eaton. Chicago: R. R. Donnelley & Sons Company. LCCN 14020754.

=== Articles ===
- — (October 1892). "The Acadian province-by-the-sea". The New England Magazine. No. 7. Boston: J. N. McClinctock and Company. pp. 157–173. OCLC 1007603949.
- — (1912). The settling of Colchester County, Nova Scotia. Ottawa: Royal Society of Canada. pp. 221–265. LCCN 13012509.
- — (1913–1914). "Eminent Nova Scotians of New England birth". New England Historical and Genealogical Register. 67–68. Boston: New England Historic Genealogical Society.
- — (1913–1919). "Chapters in the history of Halifax, Nova Scotia; Rhode Island settlers in Hants County, Nova Scotia; Alexander McNutt the colonizer". Americana. 8–13. LCCN unk81038499. Collection of 15 of Eaton's previously published articles.

=== Genealogical works ===
- — (1885). Genealogical Sketch of the Nova Scotia Eatons. Morning Herald Office: Halifax, NS. LCCN 01027984.
- — (1893). The Olivestob Hamiltons. New York: [s.n.] LCCN 10018950.
- — (1893). Memorial Sketch of William Eaton. New York: [s.n.] LCCN 21009654.
- — (1895). The Elmwood Eatons. Kentville, NS: [s.n.] LCCN 21009025.
- — (1899). The Cochran-Inglis Family of Halifax. Halifax, NS: C.H. Ruggles. LCCN 02022154.
- — (1899). Families of Eaton-Sutherland, Layton-Hill. New York: [s.n.] LCCN 05025482.
- — (1913). The De Blois Family. Boston: [s.n.] LCCN 13012769.
- — (1913). The Gerrish Family (Family of Capt. John Gerrish). Boston: [s.n.] LCCN 13012588.
- — (1929). The Eaton Family of Nova Scotia, 1760–1929. Cambridge, Mass.: The Murray Printing Company. LCCN 29008766.
