= CIHM =

CIHM can refer to:

- Canadian Institute for Historical Microreproductions, now known as Canadiana.org
- College of International Hospitality Management (now the College of International Tourism Hospitality Management), part of Lyceum of the Philippines University
