= Europeana =

Digital collection of European cultural heritage

- Website type: Meta-aggregator and display space for European digitised works
- Owner: Europeana Foundation
- Website: europeana.eu/en
- Commercial: no
- Launched: November 20, 2008; 18 years ago (prototype), February 2009; 17 years ago (official version 1.0)
- Current status: Online

Europeana is a web portal created by the European Union containing digitised cultural heritage collections of more than 3,000 institutions across Europe. It includes records of over 50 million cultural and scientific artefacts, brought together on a single platform and presented in a variety of ways relevant to modern users. The prototype for Europeana was the European Digital Library Network (EDLnet), launched in 2008.

The Europeana Foundation is the governing body of the service, and is incorporated under Dutch law as Stichting Europeana.

== History ==
Europeana had its beginnings after a letter was jointly sent in April 2005 by Jacques Chirac, President of France, and the premiers of Germany, Spain, Italy, Poland and Hungary to the President of the European Commission, José Manuel Durão Barroso. It urged the creation of a virtual European library in order to make Europe's cultural heritage more accessible to everyone.

The letter helped to give added support to work that the European Commission's Information Society and Media Directorate had already been conducting over the previous ten years, such as the Telematics for Libraries project. It also offered strong political support to the Directorate's strategy (i2010: communication on digital libraries), published in September 2005. This made clear the intention to create and support a European digital library, covering the whole European Union in order to encourage growth of the information society and related media industries.

The first project that started the building of Europeana was the European Digital Library Network (EDLnet), whose role was to establish a prototype model for a user-focussed service, capable of working across national borders and across differing domains. The European Commission funded EDLnet from its eContentplus programme.

The European Digital Library Network prototype was launched on 20 November 2008. It initially provided access to 4.5 million digital objects, which was twice as many as initially intended, and received data contributions from over a thousand separate organisations, including many internationally renowned libraries, gallery and museum collections from many different European capital cities.

The successor of EDLnet (Europeana version 1.0) began life in February 2009. It ran for 2.5 years and, by 2010, the initial prototype had developed into a full service, providing access to over 10 million digital records of cultural objects. New features were added in 2011, including a translation tool and a function to expand searches onto other platforms, including Wikipedia.

== Function and description ==
Europeana contains digitalised museum collections.

Europeana gives access to different types of content from different types of heritage institutions. The digital objects that users can find in Europeana are not stored on a central computer, but remain with the cultural institution and are hosted on their networks. Europeana collects contextual information – or metadata – about the items, including a small picture. Users search this contextual information. Once they find what they are looking for, if they want to access the full content of the item, they can click through to the original site that holds the content.

Different types of cultural heritage organisations – libraries, museums, archives and audiovisual collections – catalogue their content in different ways and to different standards. Approaches also vary in different countries. To make the information searchable, it has to be mapped to a single common standard, known as the Europeana Semantic Elements, and based on Dublin Core. This metadata standard at present takes a lowest common denominator approach to the integration of different types of digital content. In 2010 the Europeana Data Model, a richer metadata standard, was introduced to help give users more and better information.

Europeana accepts metadata about digital objects, it does not make any decisions about digitisation. The decision about which objects are digitised lies with the organisation that holds the material.

More than 3,000 institutions across Europe have contributed to Europeana, including the Rijksmuseum, the British Library and the Louvre. Records of over 10 million cultural and scientific artefacts have been brought together on Europeana's platform, and are presented in a variety of ways relevant to modern users, such as smartphones or APIs. In 2024 Europeana claims to give access to records of more than 50 million objects.

== Strategy ==
In its Strategic Plan for 2011–2015, which was published in January 2011, Europeana outlined four strategic tracks that would shape its further development:

1. Aggregate – to build the open trusted source for European cultural and scientific heritage content;
2. Facilitate – to support the cultural and scientific heritage sector through knowledge transfer, innovation and advocacy;
3. Distribute – to make heritage available to users wherever they are, whenever they want it;
4. Engage – to cultivate new ways for users to participate in their cultural and scientific heritage.

The subsequent strategy document is for the period 2015–2020.

== Organisation ==
The Europeana Foundation is the governing body of the Europeana service. Its members are the presidents and chairs of European associations for cultural heritage and information associations.

The Foundation promotes collaboration between museums, archives, audiovisual collections and libraries so that users can have integrated access to their content through Europeana and other services.

The Foundation is incorporated under Dutch law as Stichting Europeana and is housed within the Koninklijke Bibliotheek, the national library of the Netherlands. It provides a legal framework for the governance of Europeana, employing the staff, bidding for funding and enabling the sustainability of the service.

The executive director of the Europeana Foundation is Harry Verwayen, who was appointed in May 2018.

The executive board is supported by the board of the Europeana Foundation, which is chaired by Martina Bagnoli since In 2021.

== Europeana Network and events ==
Europeana has a network for cultural heritage professionals in Europe working in digitisation. Initially known as the Council of Content Providers and Aggregators (CCPA), it has been called the Europeana Network since December 2011.

Europeana regularly runs events and conferences. Between 2011 and 2019, Europeana's annual flagship event took the form of the annual general meeting for the Europeana Network. Since 2020, the event has been an annual conference.

The event has been held online and in venues across Europe.

Year	City	Venue	Ref.
2011	Rotterdam	Beurs-World Trade Center	
2012	Berlin	Hamburger Bahnhof – Nationalgalerie der Gegenwart	
2013	Rotterdam	De Doelen	
2014	Madrid	Museo del Prado	
2015	Amsterdam	Pakhuis de Zwijger	
2016	Riga	National Library of Latvia	
2017	Milan	Museo Nazionale Scienza e Tecnologia Leonardo da Vinci	
2018	Vienna	Vienna Technical Museum	
2019	Lisbon	Biblioteca Nacional de Portugal	
2020	Online	n/a	
2021	Online	n/a	
2022	The Hague and online	Royal Library of the Netherlands	

== Europeana projects ==
There are a number of projects – the Europeana Group – that are contributing technology solutions and content to Europeana. These are run by different cultural heritage institutions, and are part-funded by the European Commission's eContentplus programme and the Information and Communications Technologies Policy Support Programme (ICT PSP).

The Europeana Group projects are:

- 3D ICONS digitising archaeological monuments and buildings in 3D
- APEx – Archives Portal Europe Network of Excellence Project
- ASSETS aims to improve the usability of Europeana.
- ATHENA aggregates museum content and promotes standards for museum digitisation and metadata.
- AthenaPlus access to cultural heritage networks for Europeana
- Biodiversity Heritage Library for Europe
- CARARE aggregates content for the archaeology and architectural heritage
- Digitising Contemporary Art (DCA)
- DM2E stimulates the creation of new tools and services for re-use of Europeana data in the Digital Humanities
- ECLAP will build a large digital library of performing arts and UGC.
- EURO-Photo digitises photographs from news agencies.
- Europeana 1914–1918 for the First World War centenary, including family histories collected in collaboration with the British Library, the National Library of Luxembourg and other institutions.
- Europeana Collections 1914-1918 which will make available 425,000 items related to the First World War for the First World War centenary. In January 2014, this material was combined with the Europeana 1914-1918 and European Film Gateway First World War material.
- Europeana Connect adds sound material to Europeana.
- Europeana Awareness a best practice network to publicise Europeana at a political level.
- Europeana Creative stimulates the creative re-use of material added to Europeana.
- Europeana Fashion will bring more than 700,000 items of fashion-related content into Europeana.
- European Film Gateway (EFG) provides more than 600,000 films and film-related content to Europeana.
- Europeana Libraries will add over 5 million digital objects to Europeana from 19 of Europe's leading research and university libraries.
- Europeana Local brings content from regional and local content holders.
- Europeana Newspapers adds records relating to 18 million newspaper pages to Europeana;
- Europeana Regia is digitising royal manuscripts from Medieval and Renaissance Europe; an exhibition of the manuscripts is available
- Europeana Sounds contributes audio material to Europeana.
- Europeana Travel will bring material associated with travel, trade, tourism and migration into Europeana.
- Europeana v1.0 is developing a fully functional Europeana website.
- EUscreen contributes television material to Europeana.
- Heritage of People's Europe (HOPE) aims to improve access to digital social history collections.
- JUDAICA Europeana looks at the Jewish contribution to Europe's cultural heritage.
- Linked Heritage aims to add substantial new content from commercial and public sectors, and enrich Europeana's metadata with a "linked data" approach.
- Musical Instrument Museums Online (MIMO)
- Natural Europe connects the digital collections of natural history museums.
- OpenUp! brings Europe's natural history heritage to Europeana
- Partage Plus digitising and enabling Art Nouveau for Europeana
- PATHS Personalised Access To cultural Heritage Spaces
- The European Library aggregates the content of national libraries.
- thinkMOTION gathers content from the field of motion systems.

Europeana regularly run engagement projects where members of the public are invited to share their stories relating to topics like World War I, migration, industrial heritage and / sport. These take place either online or at collection day events.

== Financing ==
Europeana and the projects contributing content to Europeana.eu have been funded by the European Commission under eContentplus, the Information and Communications Technologies Policy Support Programme (ICT PSP) and similar programmes. To participate in a wide range of projects, which are only funded by the commission for 50–100% of the costs and do not include overheads, Europeana is also reliant for an element of its funding on Member States' ministries of culture and education.

== See also ==
- Mexicana
- Canadiana.org
- Flandrica.be
- List of online image archives
- Virtual Centre for Knowledge on Europe
