= Italian training ship Ebe =

Former Italian Training ship

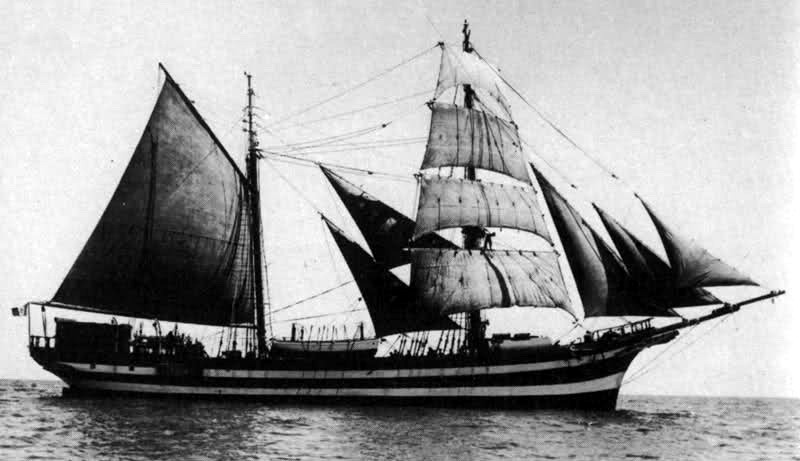

History

Italy
- Name: Ebe
- Owner: Italian Navy
- Operator: Italian Navy
- Builder: Benetti, Viareggio, Italy
- Laid down: December 1918
- Launched: 21 August 1921
- Acquired: 1952
- Renamed: San Giorgio (1921-1952), Ebe (1952-present)
- Fate: Museum ship

General characteristics
- Displacement: 601 tons
- Length: 50.5 m (165 ft 8 in)
- Beam: 8.4 m (27 ft 7 in)
- Draught: 3.7 m (12 ft 2 in)
- Propulsion: 1 x diesel engine
- Crew: 2 officers; 72 cadets/trainees

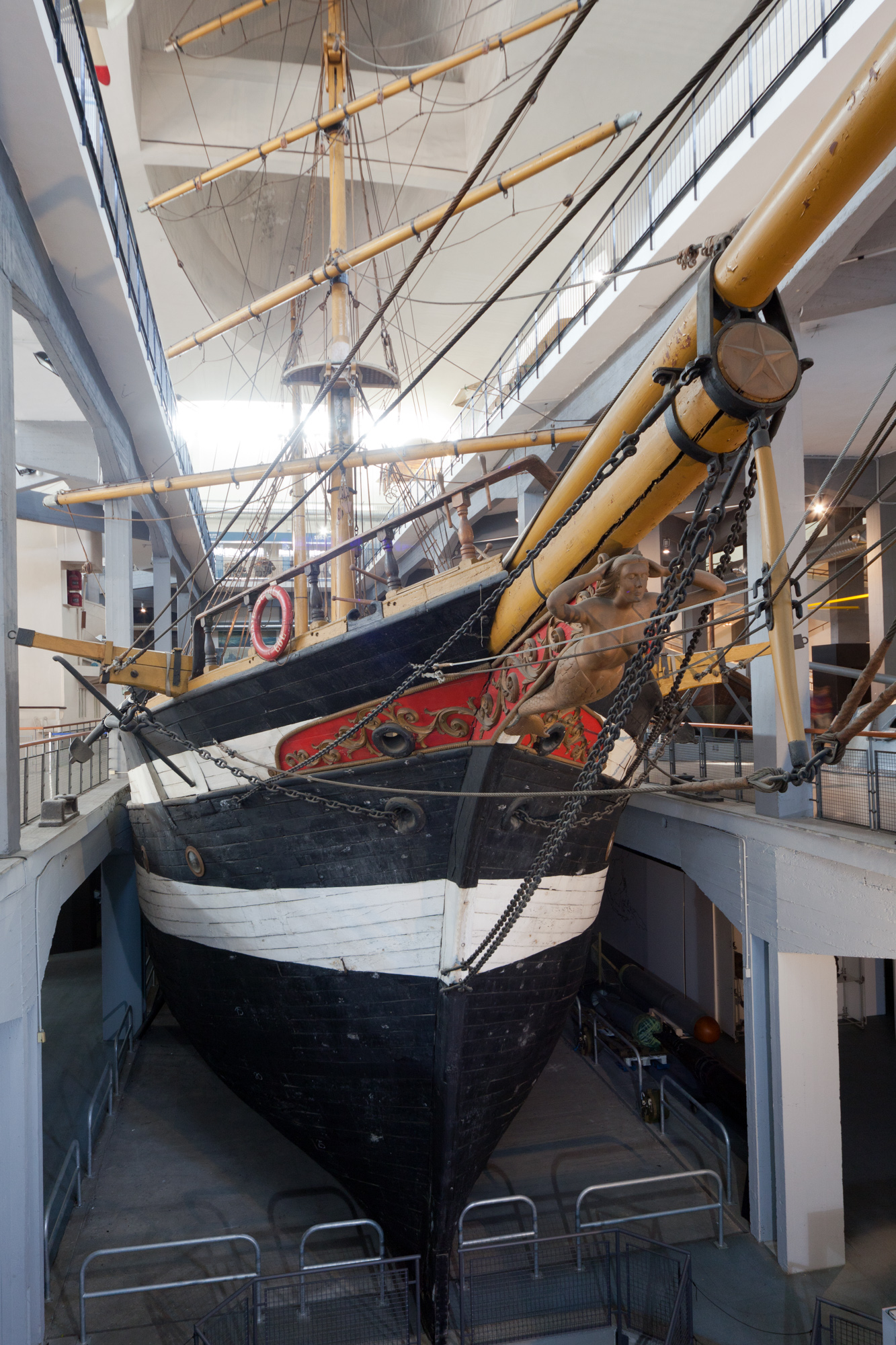
The Ebe training ship exhibited at Museo Nazionale della Scienza e della Tecnologia Leonardo da Vinci

Ebe is a former training ship of the Italian Navy. Initially a merchant vessel named San Giorgio, she was acquired by the Navy and used to train non-commissioned officers between 1952 and 1958. Since 1963 she has been preserved and exhibited at the Museo Nazionale Scienza e Tecnologia Leonardo da Vinci in Milan.

== Sea-going career ==
Construction of the vessel began in December 1918, in the Benetti shipyard in Viareggio. She was launched on 21 August 1921 under the name of San Giorgio. At first she was used for short sea shipping between Genoa and Torre del Greco. In 1937 she was equipped with an auxiliary motor that provided a speed of 4 knots in case of lack of wind. In the late 1930s and early 1940s she often transported various goods along the Cagliari - Napoli - Genoa route, covering short distances over a period of a few days. She also made occasional voyages to North Africa, transporting goods.

At the outbreak of World War II San Giorgio was requisitioned by the Italian Royal Navy and converted into a minesweeper. After the war she reverted to use as a cargo ship.

In 1952 the Italian Navy bought the San Giorgio and converted her into a training vessel under the name Ebe. The hold was converted to accommodate students, the ship was fitted with a new auxiliary motor, and the bow was decorated with a figurehead in the shape of a mermaid. From 1953 to 1956 the Ebe carried out training voyages in the Mediterranean, Tyrrhenian and Adriatic seas.

Replaced in 1958 by the training ship Palinuro, the Ebe was assigned to the base in Portoferraio and from 1960 fell into disuse. Transferred to La Spezia to be broken up, she was purchased by the Museo Nazionale Scienza e Tecnologia Leonardo da Vinci in Milan. In 1963 the shipyards in Le Grazie, a town near La Spezia, began the recovery of the hull. This was transported to Milan along with other elements and was reassembled inside the Air and Water Building of the Museum, where it is still preserved and exhibited today.

== Museum ship ==
In January 1963, the ship was towed from the arsenal of La Spezia (Marola) to the Argocarpentieri shipyard in Le Grazie. Here, Museum and shipyard technicians cut the hull into 90 different parts of about 10 tons each, which were then transported by lorry to Milan. The transfer of the bow (minus the bowsprit to make it lighter) was the most complex. Unlike other loads, which were transported along the Cisa pass, the bow was transported on a low trailer. It followed an alternative route that was supposed to encounter higher bridges that should have sufficient clearance to allow passage. Despite these precautions, the convoy encountered an overpass that prevented the cargo from passing through. A group of Museum technicians with minimal equipment reached the place on that same night and managed to cut off the top of the bow, allowing the convoy to continue its journey to Milan.

The Air & Water pavilion at the museum in Milan was specially designed by architect Nichelli to accommodate 1,000 tons of the deck of the ocean liner SS Conte Biancamano and the entire hull of Ebe with all her masts. The ship was placed on a 30 meter long reinforced concrete beam supported by pillars able to bear more than 1,000 tons. The last parts to be removed, such as the keel, were the first to be relocated. The reconstruction lasted until the end of 1963. All the rigging and sails were remounted by old toolmakers from Castellammare di Stabia, who were recalled for this operation.

In 1963, during the installation of the ship and the stepping of the mainmast, engineer Guido Ucelli di Nemi (President of the Museum) placed a gold coin under the mast step, as was common in ancient times when the construction of a ship was completed.

The Ebe and the rest of the Air & Water Transport pavilion of the museum were inaugurated on 12 April 1964 in the presence of the President of the Italian Republic Antonio Segni.
