= Flandrica.be =

Digital library by Vlaamse Erfgoedbibliotheken

Library Gems is a web portal to fully digitised library heritage from Flemish heritage organisations.

== History ==
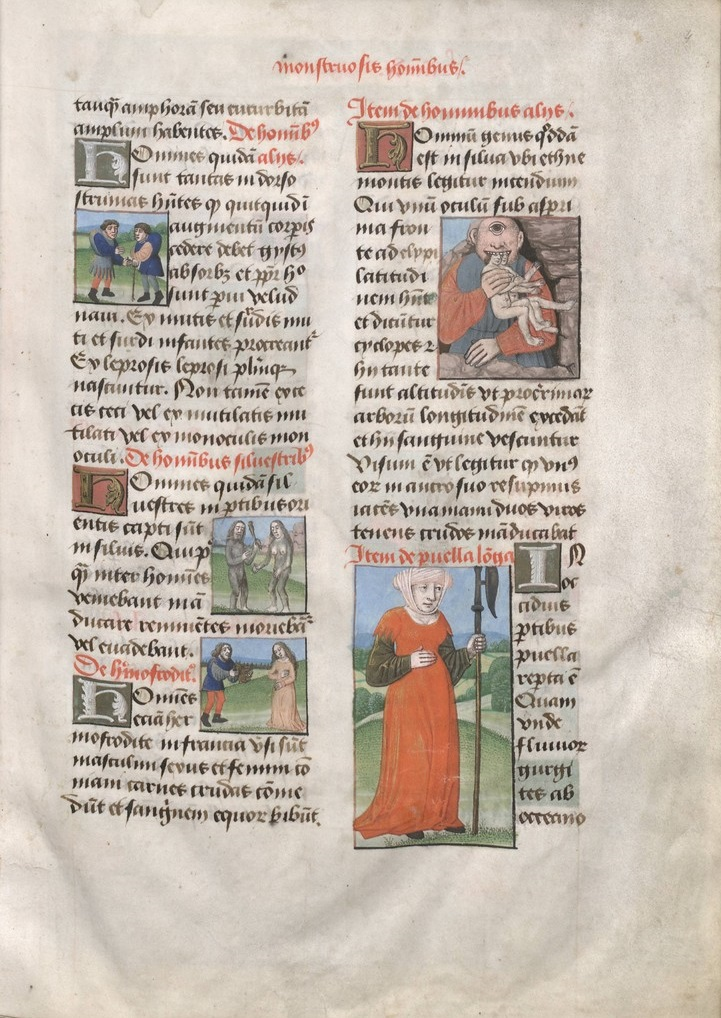
A page of a manuscript available through Librarygems.be

It was launched by LibraryHeritage.be (then still Flanders Heritage Library consortium) in 2011 as Flandrica.be, changing its name in 2026 to Library Gems. It showcases culturally significant or aesthetically pleasing items (manuscripts, printed books, periodicals and engravings) produced in or about what is now the Flemish Region of Belgium. It is funded by the Flemish Community. Most material included is also made available through the EU web portal for cultural heritage, Europeana.

== See also ==
- Europeana
- Mexicana
- Canadiana.org
