= AthenaPlus =

CIP best practice network

AthenaPlus is a CIP best practice network started in March 2013 which aims to facilitate access to networks of cultural heritage, enrich metadata, as well as improve search, retrieval and re-use of Europeana's content by enhancing multilingual terminology management and the export/publication tool. By the end of the project, AthenaPlus will contribute more than 3.6 millions of metadata records to Europeana, from both public and private sectors, focusing mainly on museums content. In addition to enabling access to cultural heritage, AthenaPlus is also focused on creative use of content, and adapting data to users with different needs by means of tools that support the development of virtual exhibitions, tourist and didactic applications.

== Movio ==
MOVIO is an open source CMS, a kit of tools, developed within the AthenaPlus project, which enables web content creation. MOVIO has a semantic approach; it can be defined as a SCMS (Semantic Content Management System) as well. It enables building online digital exhibitions targeted to different audiences and aims to enable long term accessibility to the mass of knowledge generated by temporary exhibitions that, for their nature, have a limited life span. The content is shaped using different tools integrated in the software: media archive, ontology builder, storyteller, different types of image galleries, hotspots, maps, timeline, etc. The project was initiated by the Central Institute for the Union Catalogue of the Italian Libraries (ICCU), a body of the Ministry, developed by GruppoMeta, and owing to a grant of the Fondazione Telecom Italia 2011. MOVIO is released under MIT license that allows the widest possible reuse of software. The source code has been published on GitHub.

== Partners ==
The consortium is composed of 40 partners from 21 member countries:

- Central Institute for the Union Catalogue of the Italian Libraries (ICCU), Italy (project coordinator)
- UMA Information Technology GmbH, Austria
- PACKED Expertisecentrum Digitaal Erfgoed Vzw, Koninklijke Musea voor Kunst en Geschiedenis, Openbaar Kunstbezit in Vlaanderen Vzw, Michael Culture Aisbl, Koninklijk Instituut voor het Kunstpatrimonium, Belgium
- Central Library of the Bulgarian Academy of Sciences, Bulgaria
- The Cyprus Institute Limited, Cyprus
- Muzej za umjetnost i obrt, Croatia
- National Museum, Czech Republic
- Ministry of Culture, Estonia
- Ministère de la Culture et de la Communication, European Association of Jewish Culture, *University of Savoy, Dédale, Université Pierre Mendes France, France
- Philipps Universitaet Marburg, Stiftung Preußischer Kulturbesitz, Germany
- Hellenic Ministry of Culture and Tourism, National Technical University of Athens, University of Patras, Greece
- Petőfi Irodalmi Múzeum, Hungary
- Local Government Management Agency, Board of the National Museum of Ireland, Ireland
- Istituto Centrale per il Catalogo Unico delle biblioteche italiane e per leinformazioni bibliografiche, Istituto Luigi Sturzo, Biblioteca Nazionale Centrale di Roma,
- M.E.T.A SRL (GruppoMeta), Italy
- Kulturas Informacijas Sistemu Centrs, Latvia
- Lietuvos Dailes Muziejus, Lithuania
- Stowarzyszenie Międzynarodowe Centrum Zarządzania Informacją, Poland
- Biblioteca Academiei Române, Institutul National al Patrimoniului, Romania
- Javni Zavod Republike Slovenije za Varstvo Kulturne Dediscine, Slovenia
- Departament de Cultura - Generalitat de Catalunya, Ayuntamiento de Girona, Fundacio privada i2cat, Internet i innovacio digital a Catalunya, Spain
- National Archives of Sweden, Sweden
- Collections Trust Lbg, UK
