= Europeana 1914–1918 =

Project to digitise First World War sources

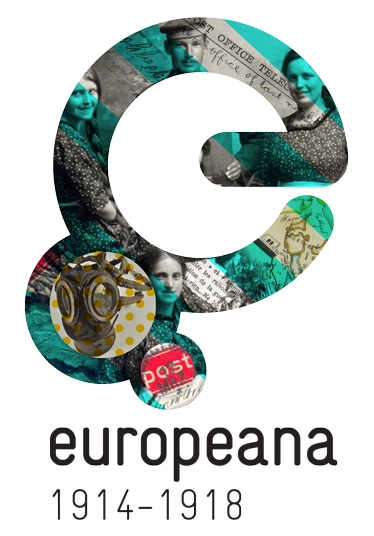
- official logo of the Europeana 1914–1918 project

Europeana 1914–1918 is a project to digitise and publish primary and secondary historical sources on the First World War. It is coordinated by Europeana, as part of a broader program to digitise European cultural heritage.

The collection is composed of three major elements. The first, also titled Europeana 1914–1918, gathers digitised memorabilia and personal stories from individuals, including a series of public workshops where material can be scanned or photographed. The second, Europeana Collections 1914–1918, is a coordinated digitisation program by ten major libraries across eight European countries. The third element, EFG1914, is a project to digitise a substantial number of wartime silent films through the European Film Gateway.

== Background ==
The Europeana 1914–1918 project was publicly announced in 2011, as "Europeana Collections 1914–1918: Remembering the First World War", with the goal of digitising over 400,000 source items from thirteen institutions. The original plan called for around 425,000 digitised items from the partner institutions. This would sit alongside 27,000 items (mostly photographs from the UK and France) already in Europeana, and include around 75,000 items already digitised but not yet added to Europeana. The focus was to be on "special collections" – manuscripts, artwork, rare books, maps, music, etc. – with the goal that most material provided would be rare or unique. Material would be hosted by the institutions but accessible through an aggregated service, and where possible copyright issues would be resolved to ensure maximal reusability of material.

Overall, the project was anticipated to cost around 5.4 million euro, the bulk of which was due to 3.1 million euro in staffing costs at the partner institutions and 1 million in costs for sub-contracted digitisation. (The bulk of digitisation was carried out in-house.)

Material from "Collections" was released to the Europeana site as it was digitised and uploaded, with the first collections (newspapers from Austria and photographs/magazines from Italy) released in March 2012. The first public events to showcase these digitised collections began in 2013, continuing through release in 2014.

The public "Europeana 1914–18" project opened for online submissions and began the first public roadshow events in March 2011. These events invited members of the public to bring physical artefacts or documents to be digitised, and to record information or stories connected to them. 51 sessions were run across Europe up to December 2013. The public initiative used the Community Collection Model founded by Stuart Lee and Kate Lindsay at the University of Oxford in 2008 and used for The Great War Archive. The University of Oxford was a partner in Europeana 1914–1918, providing support in the development of the online platform and training to all institutions running roadshow events.

== Release and reception ==
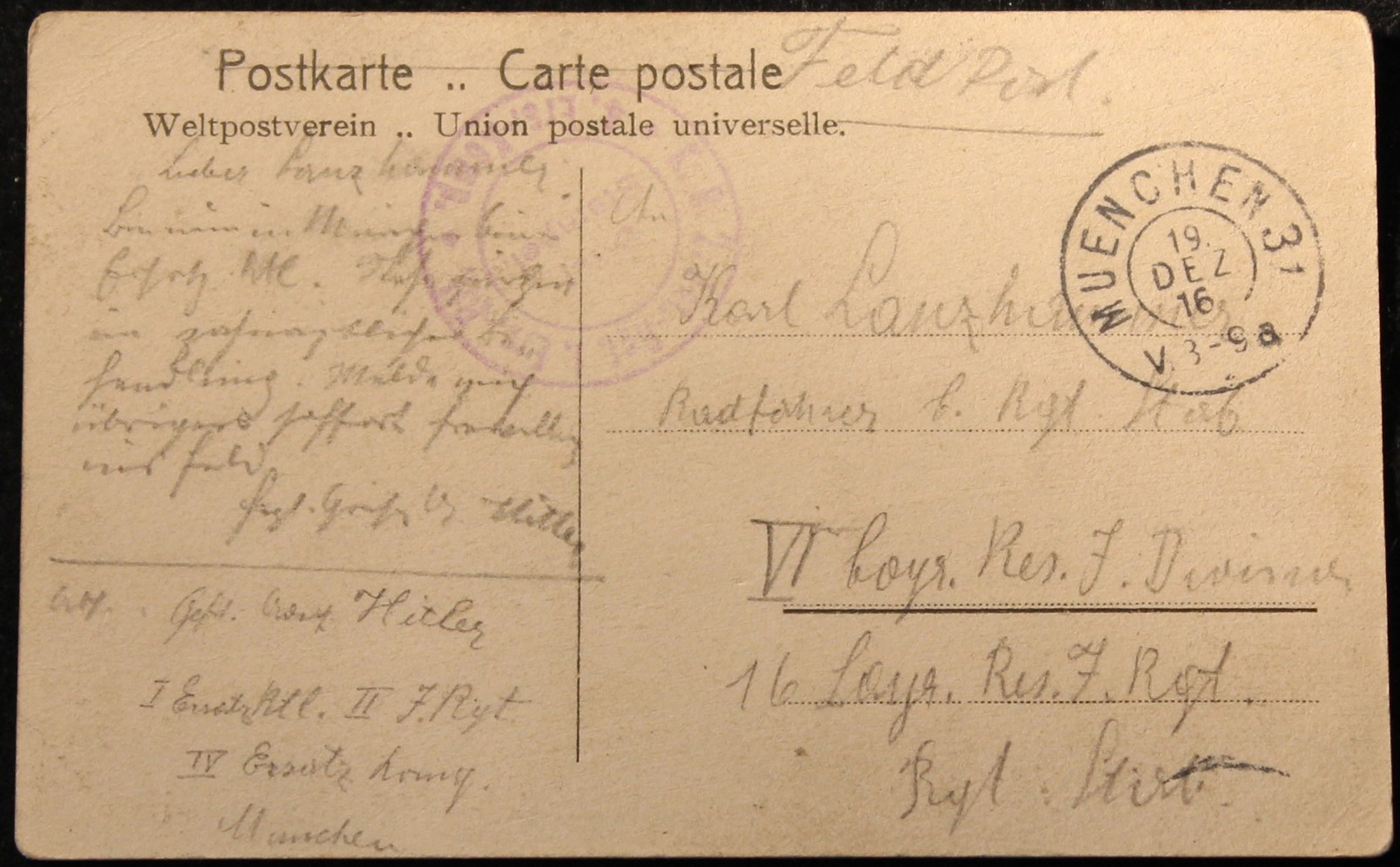
A postcard sent by Adolf Hitler in 1916, digitised at a public roadshow in 2012.

The main public-facing portal for the overall project (europeana1914-18.eu) was launched at the Berlin State Library on 29 January 2014 by Monika Grütters, the German Federal Commissioner for Culture and Media. At the time of launch, the site had around 400,000 digitised items from the partner institutions, alongside 90,000 "personal" items and 660 hours of film.

Public reaction to the collections has often highlighted individual items or small collections. For example, digitised correspondence from the British Library's India Office collections has been used to highlight the involvement of Indian soldiers, particularly on the Western Front; An early find during the public digitisation project was a postcard (right) sent by Adolf Hitler to a fellow soldier while recuperating in hospital, which attracted a great deal of media attention.
