= Thermal power station Regina Margherita =

Former power station in Milan, Italy

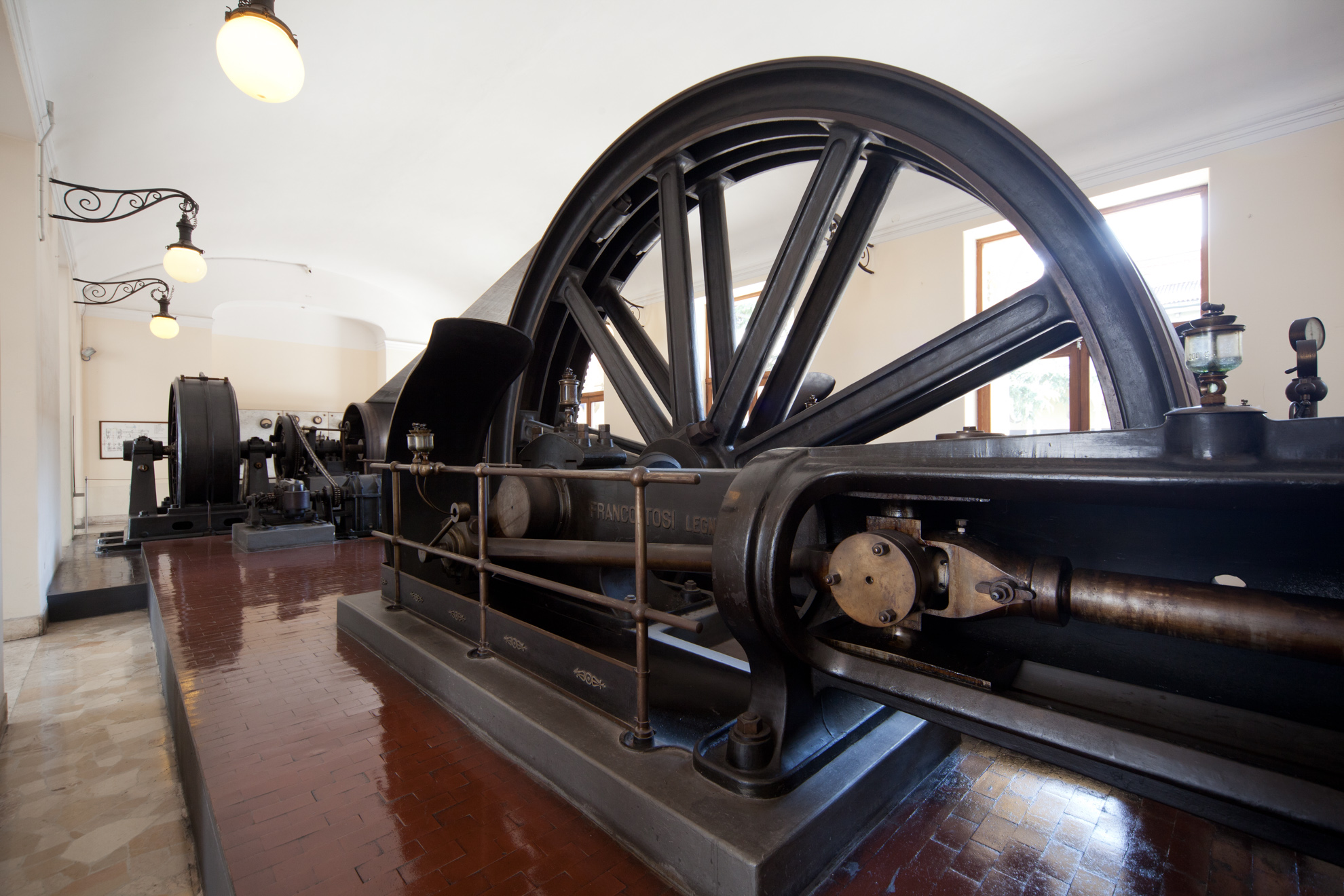
The thermal power station Regina Margherita, preserved and exhibited at the Museo nazionale della scienza e della tecnologia Leonardo da Vinci in Milan - Italy

The thermal power station Regina Margherita was a large power station for the production of electricity, preserved at the Museo nazionale della scienza e della tecnologia Leonardo da Vinci in Milan, Italy. The station opened in 1895 and was originally installed in the Egidio e Pio Gavazzi silk factory in Desio (Milan), where it operated until 1954. It supplied electricity for lighting and for the operation of 1,800 looms, generating alternating electric current at a voltage of 200 V.

== History ==
Designed at the Polytechnic University of Milan, it was built by combining a steam engine from the Franco Tosi company of Legnano and a pair of alternators from the Brown Boveri company.

The power station opened on November 9, 1895; the ceremony was attended by King Umberto I and Margherita of Savoy, to whom the plant was dedicated.

=== Museum ===
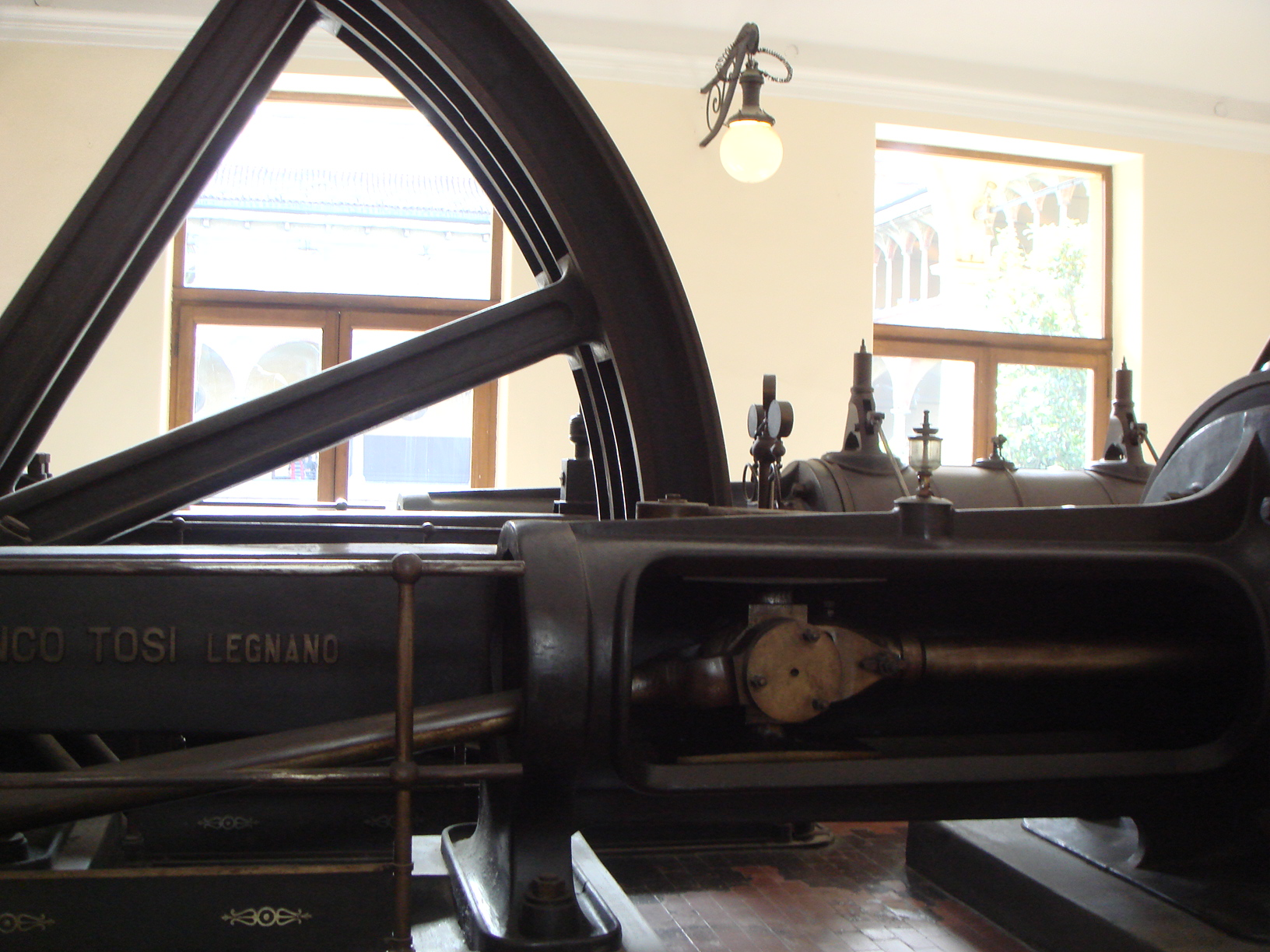
Detail

In 1958 Egidio e Pio Gavazzi proposed to donate the power plant to the Museo nazionale della scienza e della tecnologia Leonardo da Vinci. In order to exhibit the large machine, the floor was demolished, a stronger basement was built to support the item and the technical press consultation room was moved. Then the Desio plant was dismantled using maintenance cranes and it was transported with a Riva lorry to the museum, where it was reassembled by hand and connected to an electric motor, coupled with a reduction gear, and set in motion. The furnace and boiler, with their connected steam distribution pipes and pumps, were not transferred to the museum.

== Description ==
The station contains two parts: thermal, consisting of a steam engine with two horizontal cylinders, and electric, consisting of two alternators and two exciter dynamos. There is also an electric control panel and a lighting system with 8 lamps. The machine is activated by an electric motor, connected to it by a chain which encircles a pulley, and it no longer produces current.

== Technique ==
This machine is an example of a compound steam engine.

Although it relied on the finest nineteenth-century technologies, the "Regina Margherita" was not a cutting-edge piece of machinery. Ten years before its making, the Englishman Sir Charles Algernon Parsons had already invented the steam turbine. In the latter device the force of the steam acts directly on the blades of the wheel, producing the rotation necessary to operate the alternators. The steam turbine is more efficient than a cylinder and piston system because it reduces energy waste from the transformation of alternating motion into rotary motion and from the transmission of movement through connecting rods, cranks and belts.
