= Bartleby.com =

American online homework help service

- Headquarters: United States
- Owner: Learneo
- Website: www.bartleby.com
- Commercial: yes
- Launched: 1993
- Current status: Retired as of November 9th, 2026.

Bartleby.com was an American online homework help service, formerly an electronic text archive, headquartered in Los Angeles (US) and named for Herman Melville's story "Bartleby, the Scrivener". It was a commercial website operated by Learneo, though its repository of texts can still be accessed. The repository has four main categories: reference, verse, fiction, and nonfiction. The website was closed down on November 9th, 2026.

== History ==
It was initiated with the name "Project Bartleby" in January 1993 as a collection of classic literature as part of the website of Columbia University. In February 1994, they published the first classic book in HTML code format, Walt Whitman's Leaves of Grass.

Barnes & Noble Education (BNED) is an independent, public company that began trading using the New York Stock Exchange on August 3, 2015. In 2017 it acquired Student Brands, an education technology company which was then operating Bartleby.com as a digital study website. Due to the site’s ability to gain user acquisition by SEO, Bartleby.com was chosen to serve as the basis of a new set of products and services emphasizing improving student success and outcomes.

In 2023, BNED sold Bartleby.com (along with its Student Brands products) to Learneo.

In 2026, Bartleby announced that the website would retire on 9 November 2026.

== Student cheating ==
Bartleby's system Learn provides a question-and-answer service similar to that of Chegg. Students have been identified as using this to engage in contract cheating. Some universities therefore explicitly forbid students from using Bartleby's Q&A service.
