= Elizabeth Lichtenstein Johnston =

American author

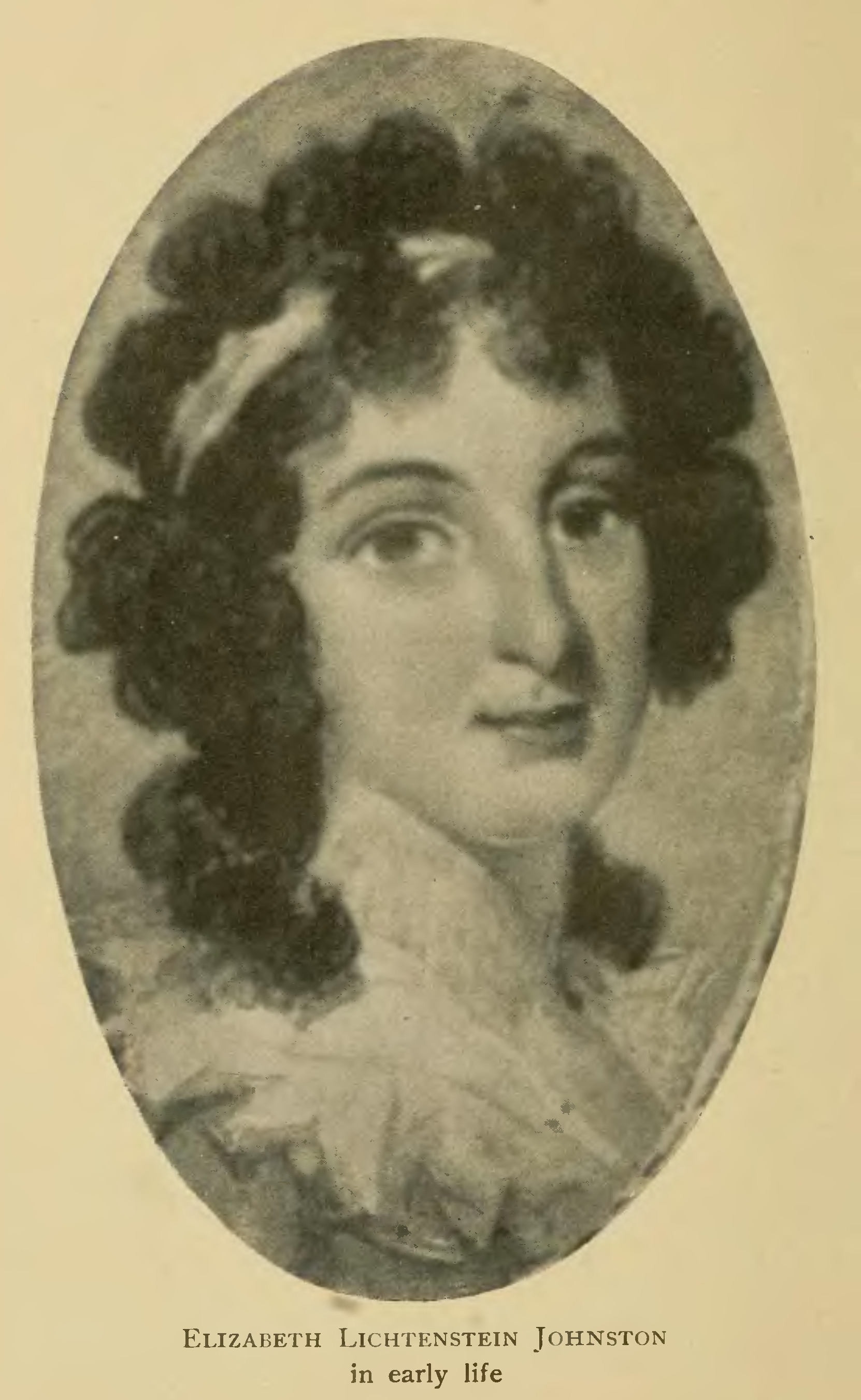
Elizabeth Lichtenstein Johnston

Elizabeth Lichtenstein Johnston (1764–1848) was an American known for writing about her experiences of living in the Colony of Georgia during the American Revolutionary War.

== Life ==
Lichtenstein Johnston was born on May 28, 1764, to Johann Lichtenstein, a Russian immigrant, and Catherine Delegal. She married William Martin Johnston in 1779 and had 10 children with him. She and her family were loyal to England during the war.

She wrote about her experience living through the war in a book called Recollections of a Georgia Loyalist in 1836.

Her son, James William Johnston, was Premier of the Colony of Canada from 1857 to 1860 and also in 1864.
