= Museo Nazionale Scienza e Tecnologia Leonardo da Vinci =

Museum in Milan, Italy

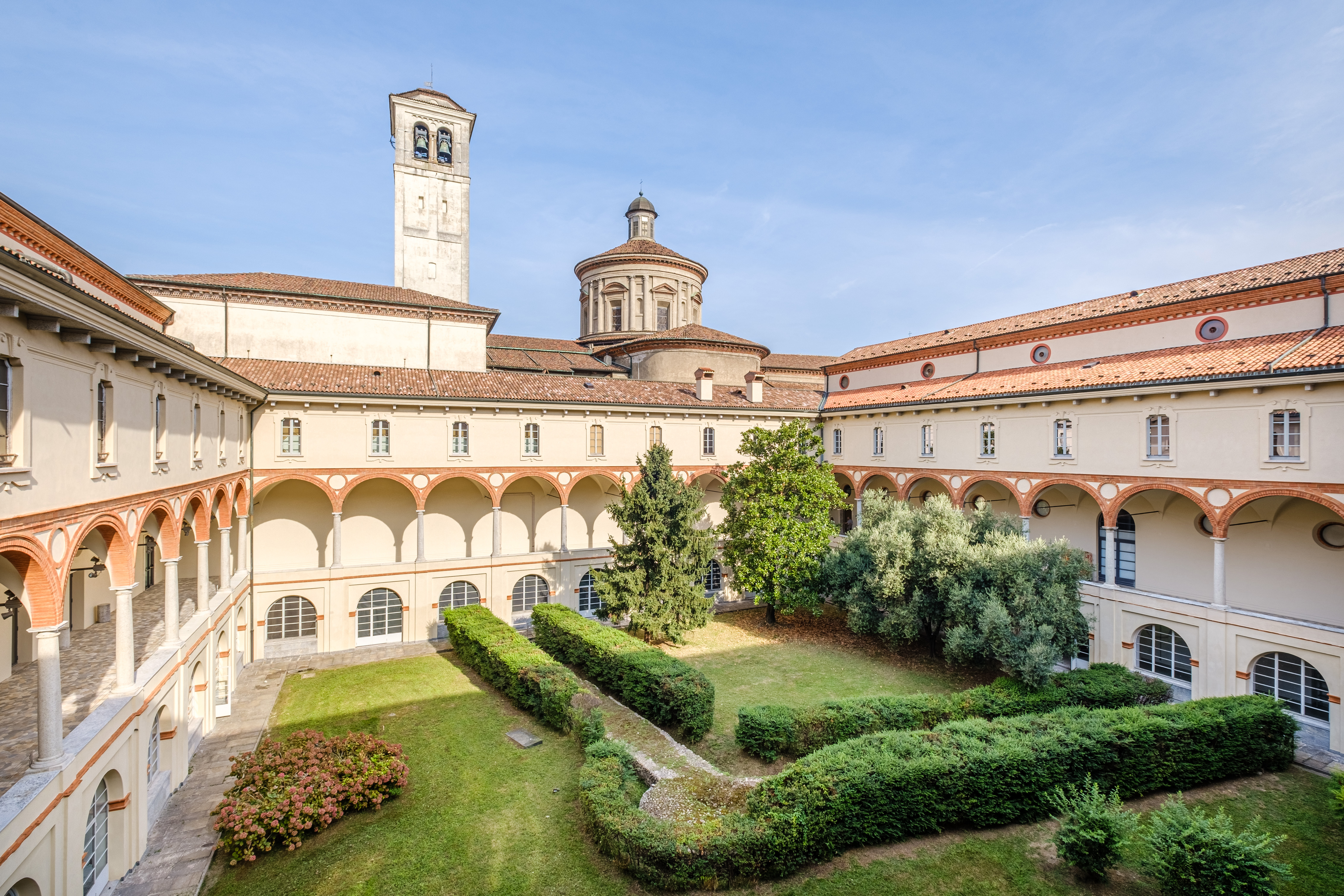
- National Museum of Science and Technology
- Interactive fullscreen map
- Established: 1953
- Location: Via S. Vittore 21 – 20123 Milan – Italy
- Coordinates: 45°27′47″N 9°10′16″E
- Director: Fiorenzo Galli
- Website: museoscienza.org

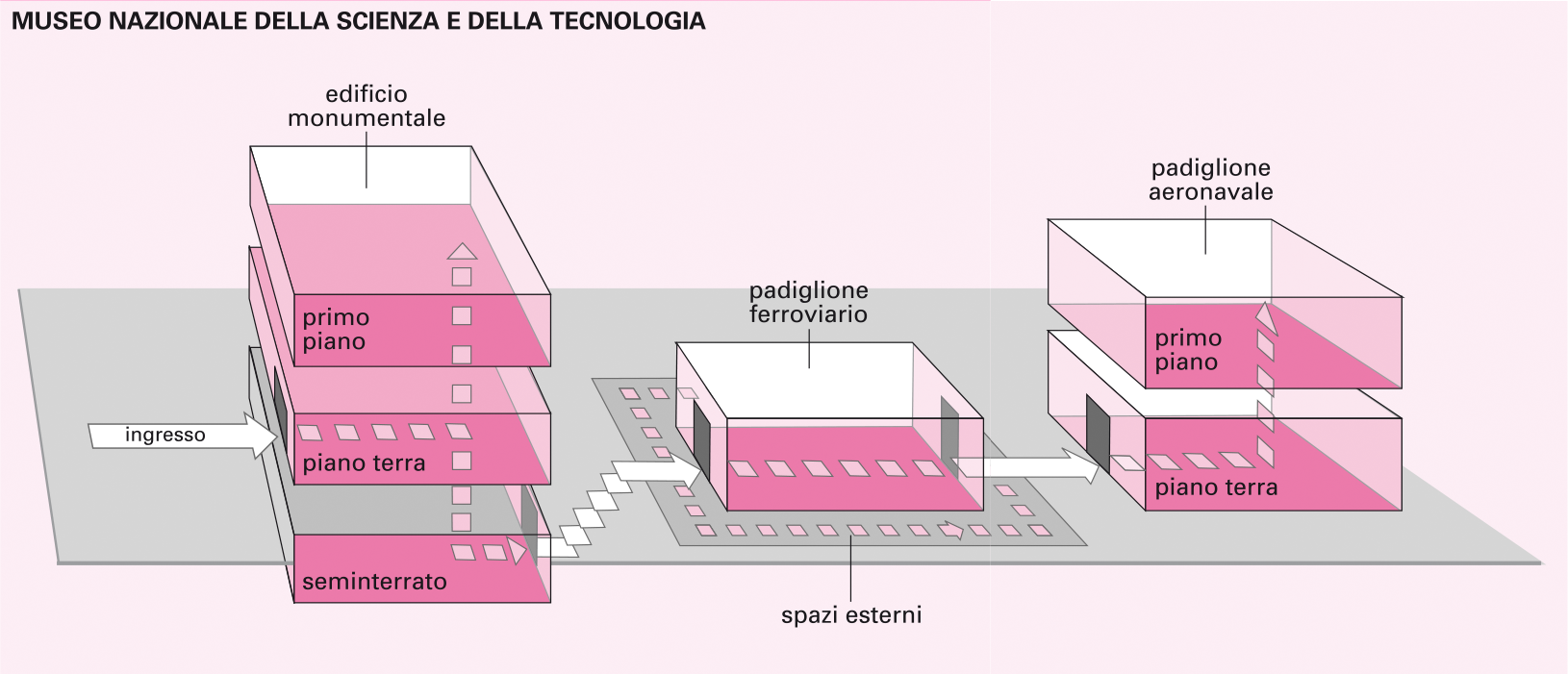
General plan of the museum

Museo Nazionale Scienza e Tecnologia Leonardo da Vinci in Milan, dedicated to painter and scientist Leonardo da Vinci, is the largest science and technology museum in Italy. It was opened on 15 February 1953 and inaugurated by Prime Minister Alcide De Gasperi.

The museum, in the ancient monastery of San Vittore al Corpo in Milan, is divided into seven main departments:

- Materials
- Transport
- Energy (including Thermal power station Regina Margherita)
- Communication
- Leonardo da Vinci, Art & Science
- New Frontiers
- Science for young people

Each of these departments have laboratories, especially for children and young students. The Transport section is made up of four different parts: air, rail, water and Submarine Enrico Toti-S-506.

== Materials section ==
The Materials section treats the life cycle of modern products from raw materials to recycling. Specific sections are dedicated to polymeric and synthetic materials and to basic chemical manufacturing. There is also a metal section that illustrates the metal extraction and processing techniques and exhibits the first electric arc furnace for melting steel invented in 1898 by Ernesto Stassano.

== Transport section ==
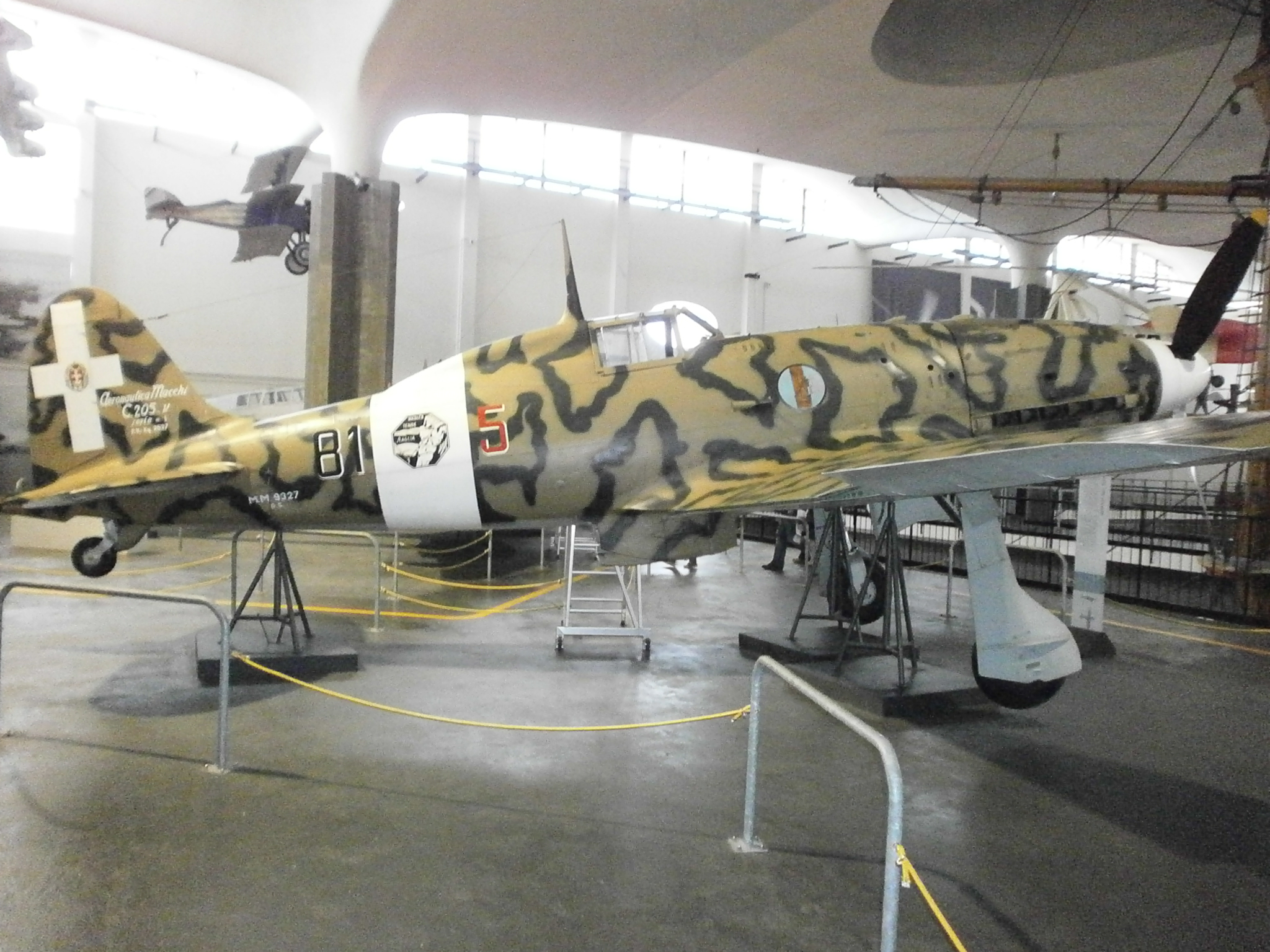
Macchi MC 205 V

The Transport section is divided in four different sections:

- The Air transport section exhibits several aircraft including a Farman 1909 replica and an original Macchi MC 205 V used by the Regia Aeronautica Militare Italiana during the Second World War. There are also several modern military aircraft like an Italian Fiat G.91, a North American F-86K and a Republic F-84F Thunderstreak.
- The Rail Transport section is sited in a pavilion from the 1906 Expo with an added reconstruction of a late 19th-century railway station facade. The collection exhibits vehicles from the 19th and 20th centuries with a particular focus on the historical public transport of Lombardy.
- The Water transport section displays the bridge of the transatlantic liner Conte Biancamano, and the training ship Ebe launched in 1921. Also exhibited are a slow running torpedo (or Maiale) and an explosive punt (1940) both used by the Italian Royal Navy in the Second World War.
- The last section is dedicated to the Toti-class submarine Enrico Toti, built by Italian shipbuilders after the Second World War for the Italian Navy and launched in 1967.

== Energy section ==
The Energy section is dedicated to energy sources and devices. In this part of the museum there is the Margherita thermoelectric power station (1895) and an oil industry/petrochemistry section.

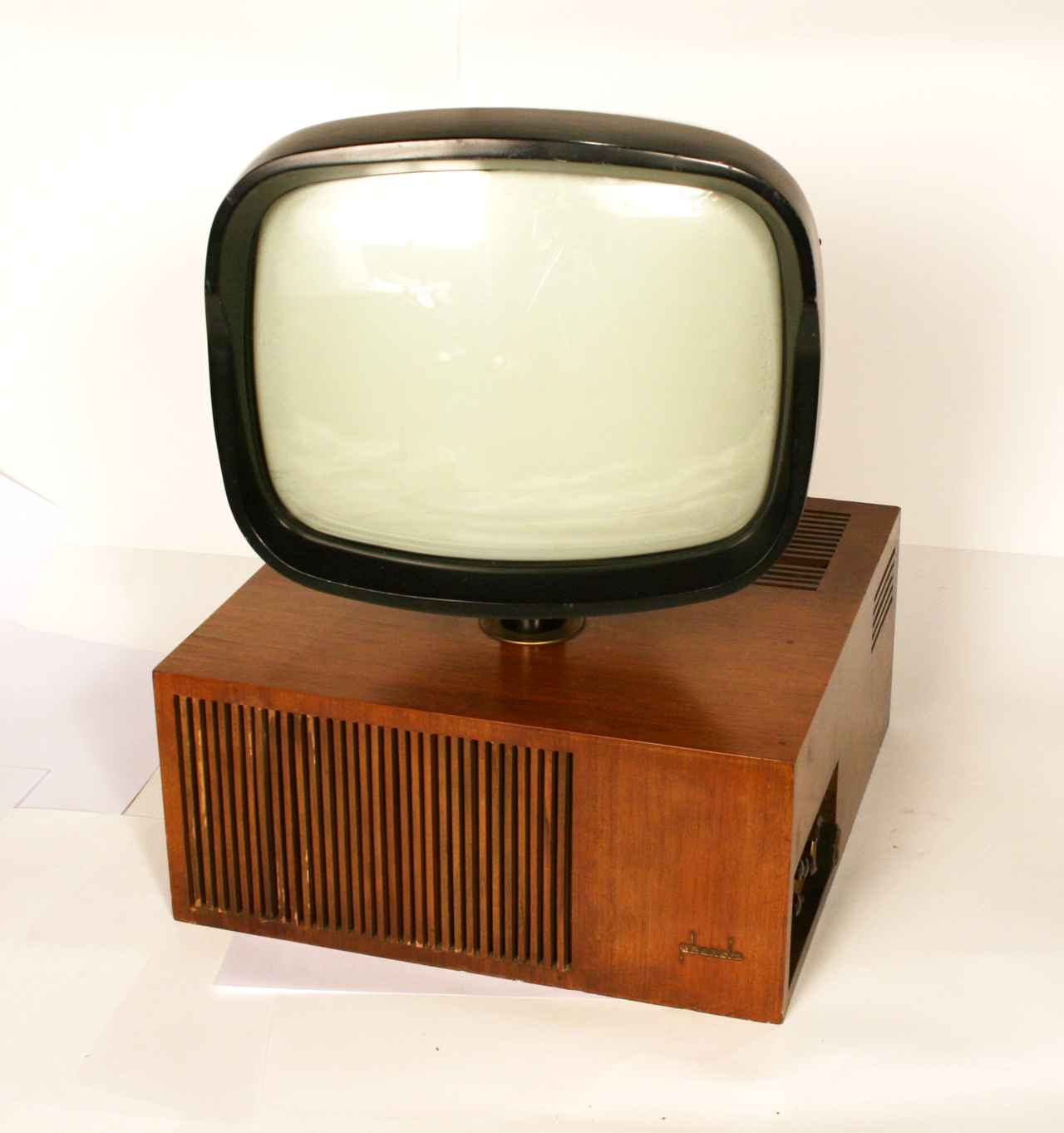
Phonola model 1718 television

== Communication section ==
The Communication section is divided into three areas:

- The Astronomy section shows several antique astronomic and topographical instruments, including two 17th-century celestial and earth globes, the Salmoiraghi refracting telescope, and a Foucault pendulum.
- The Telecommunication section is dedicated to all forms of modern-era communication from telegraph to telephone and wireless communication, and from radio to television, with a global view of the technical history of Italian television.
- The Sound section shows the main technologies for recording and reproducing sound from the 19th century to modern times.

== Leonardo da Vinci, Art & Science section ==
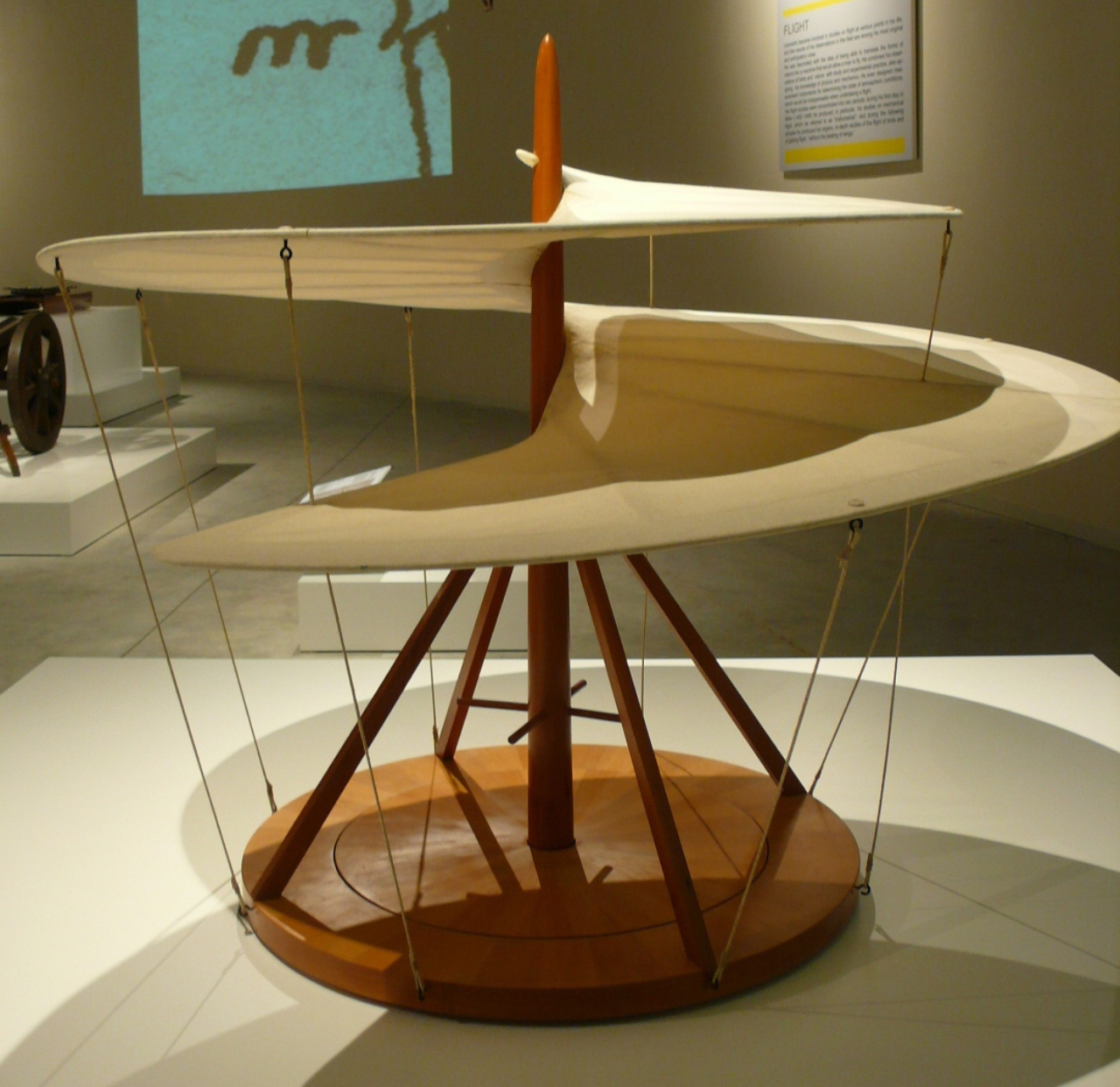
Flying machine by Leonardo da Vinci

The Leonardo da Vinci, Art & Science area is divided into four parts:

- The Jewelry collection shows precious objects from stones and gems to metals, including gold and ivory jewellery.
- The Leonardo da Vinci section exhibits many Leonardo machines reproduced from Da Vinci drawings, including a hydraulic saw, a spinning machine, a flying machine and Leonardo's tank. The models of the collection are the fruit of a reinterpretation by a group of experts who have translated and completed his drawings.
- The Horology collection shows the evolution of watchmaking and shows several pendulum clocks, ancient clocks, personal watches and tower mechanisms.
- The Musical Instruments section exhibits instruments from the 17th to the 20th century. There is a reconstruction of a lute maker's workshop from the 17th century.

== Gallery ==
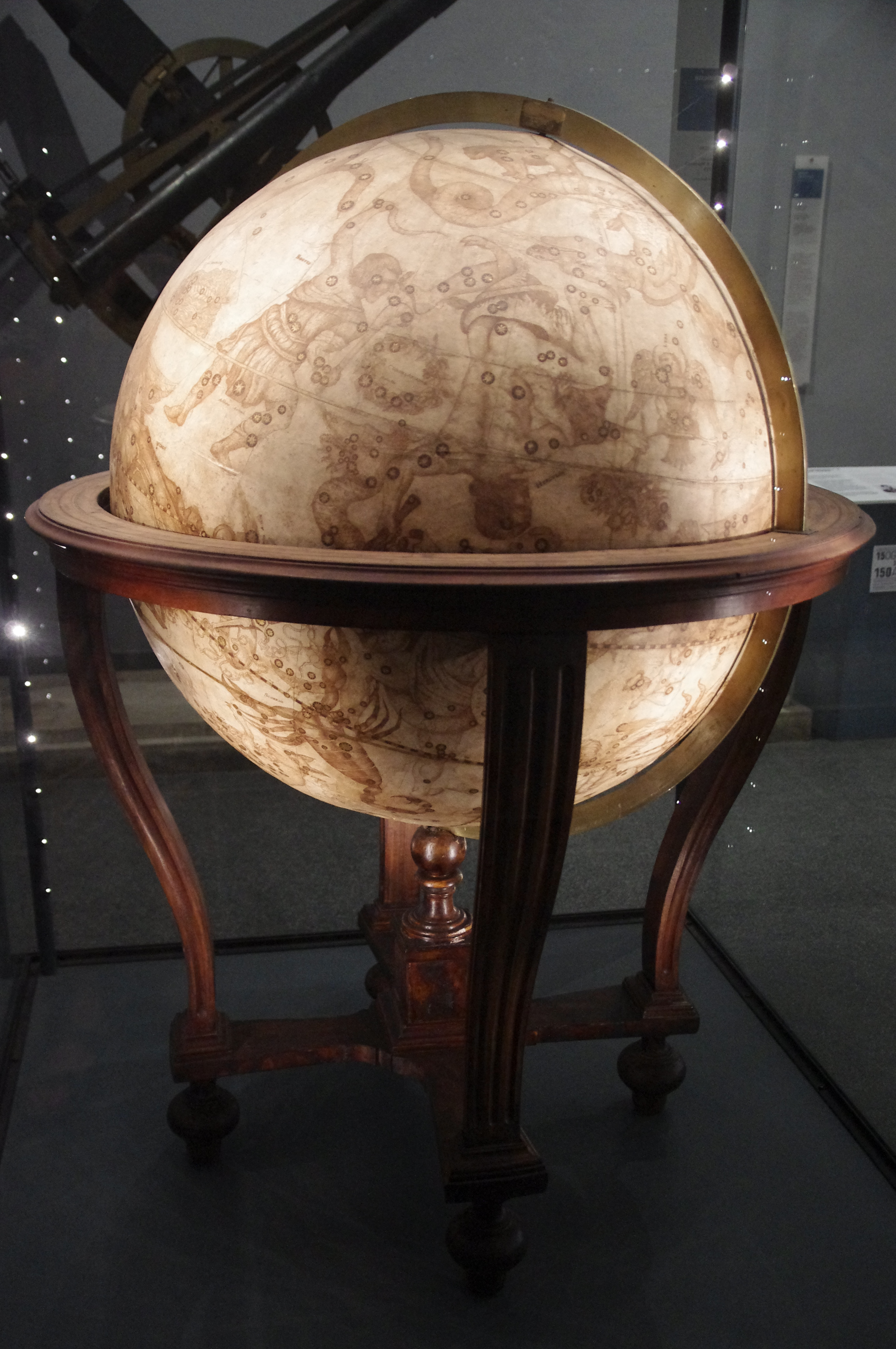
A celestial globe

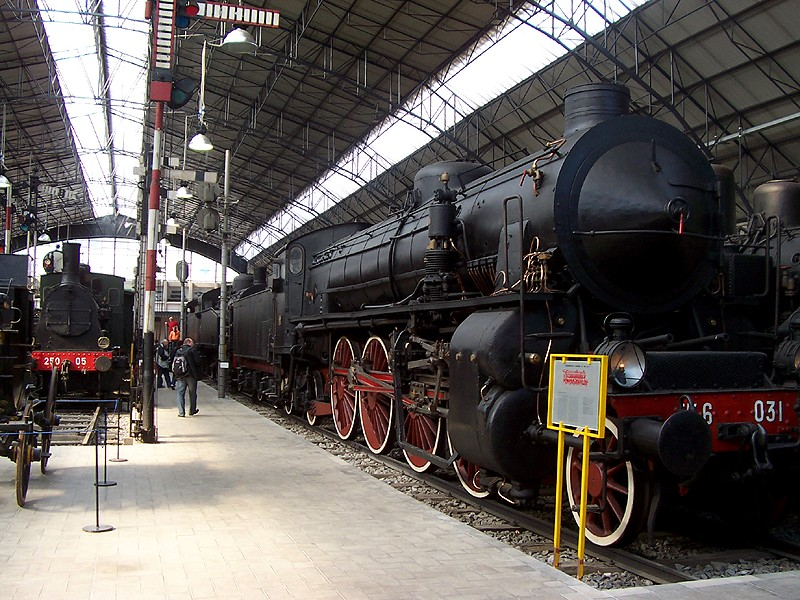
View of some trains in the museum

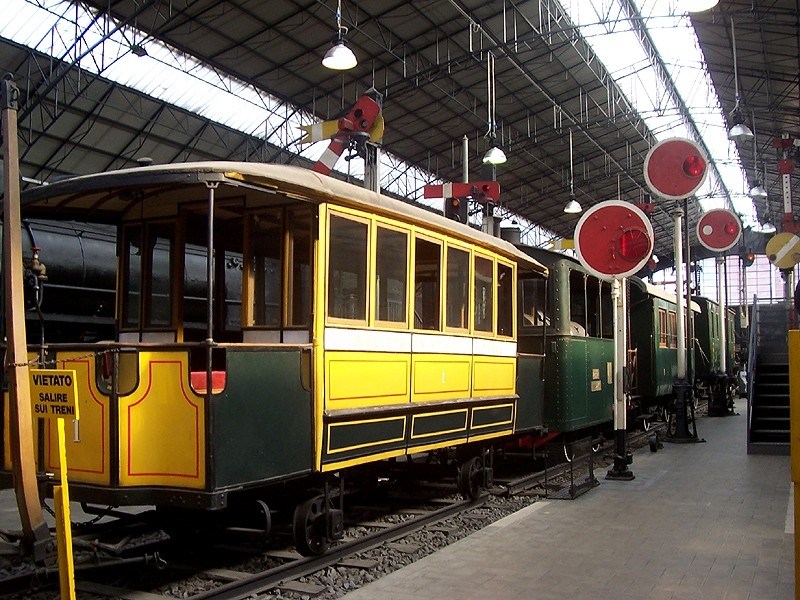
Another view of the rail section of the museum

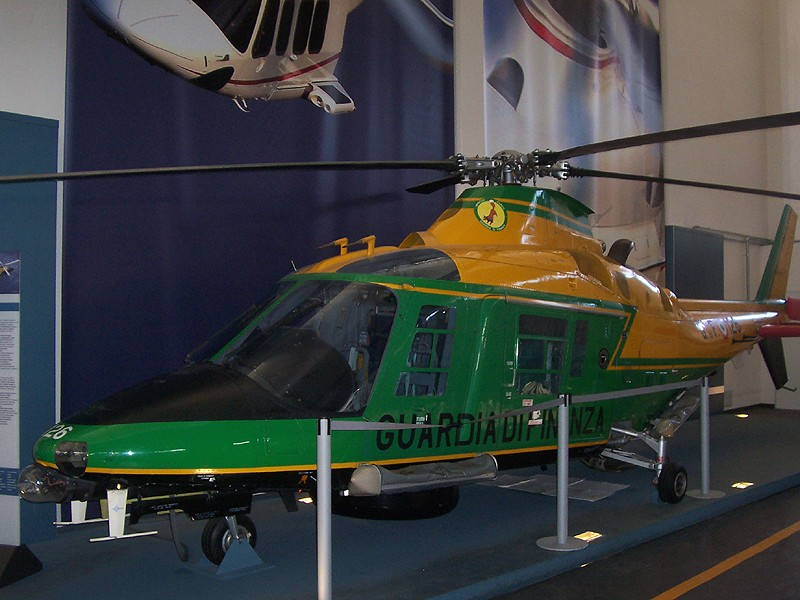
An Italian Financial Guard helicopter

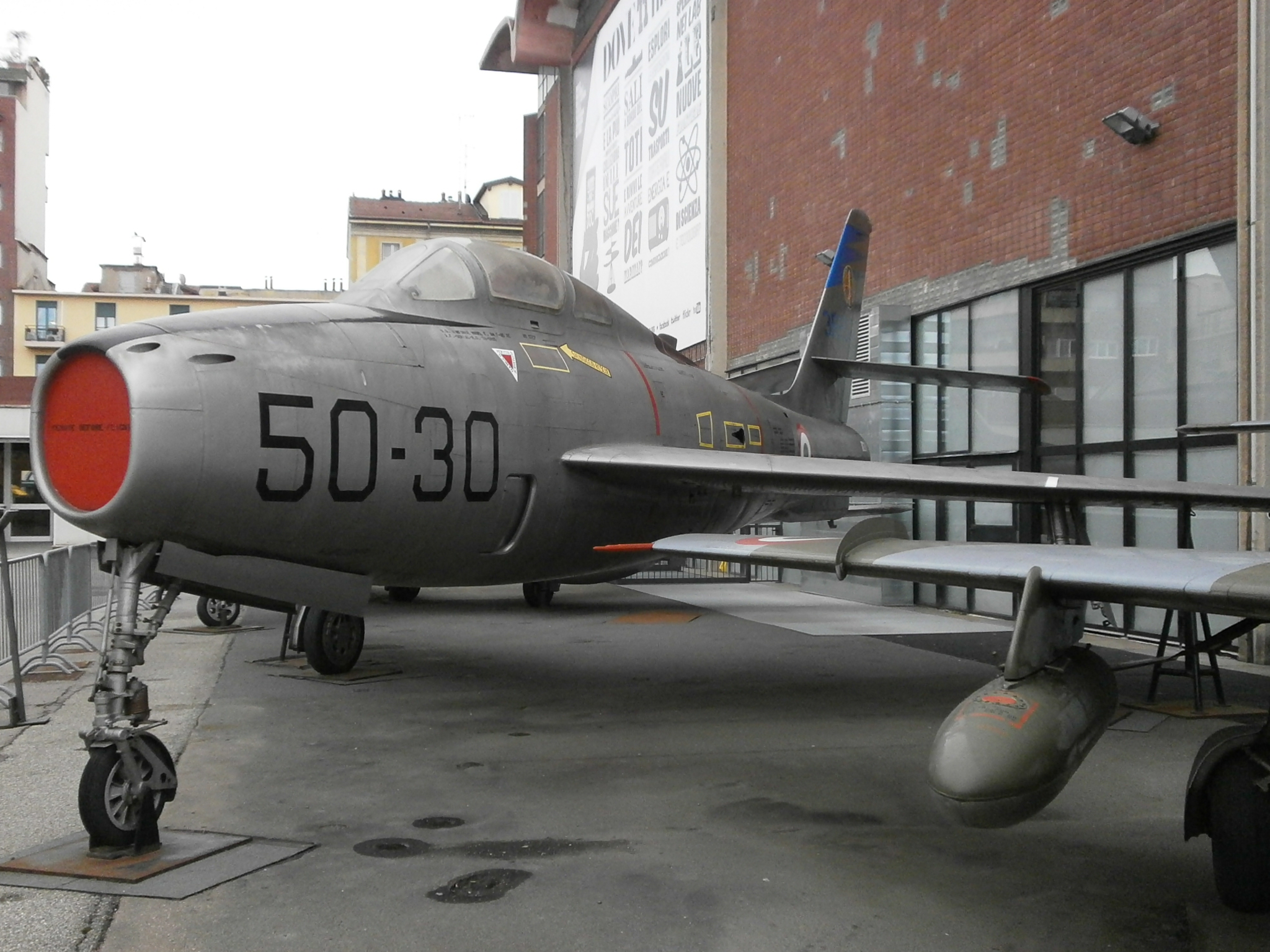
Republic F-84F Thunderstreak

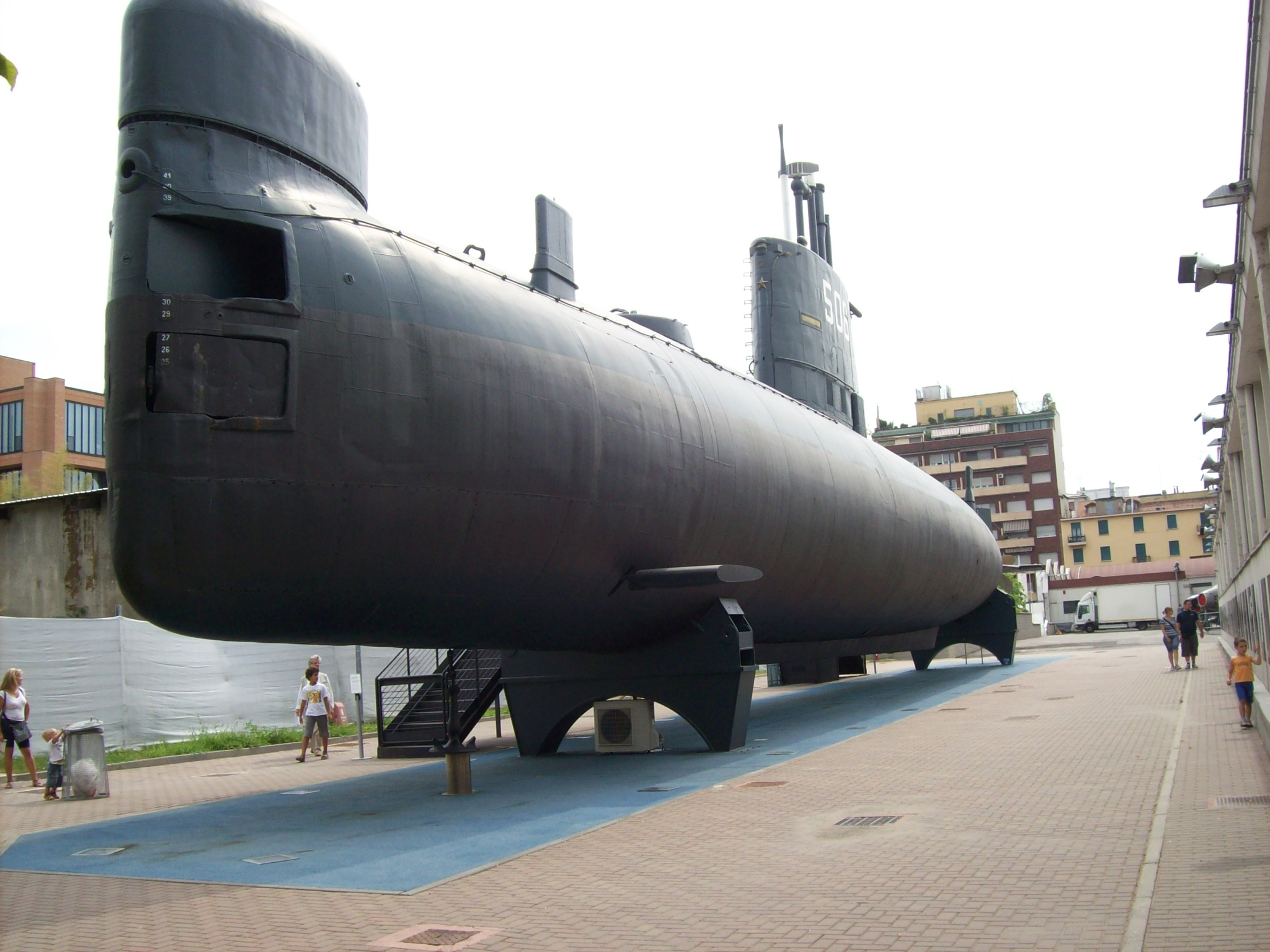
The Submarine Enrico Toti-S-506

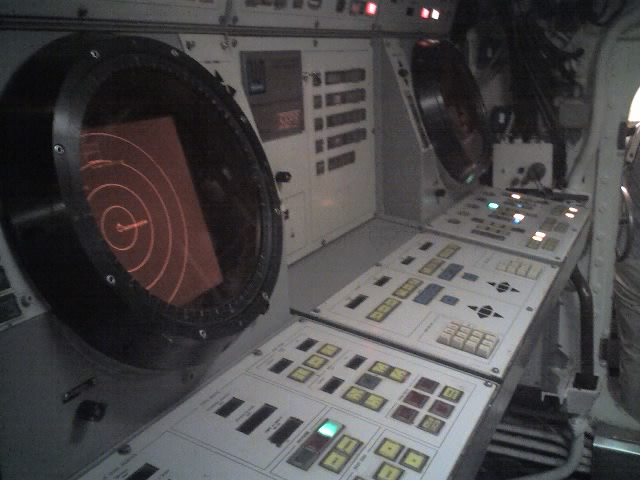
Control room for torpedoes of Submarine Enrico Toti-S-506

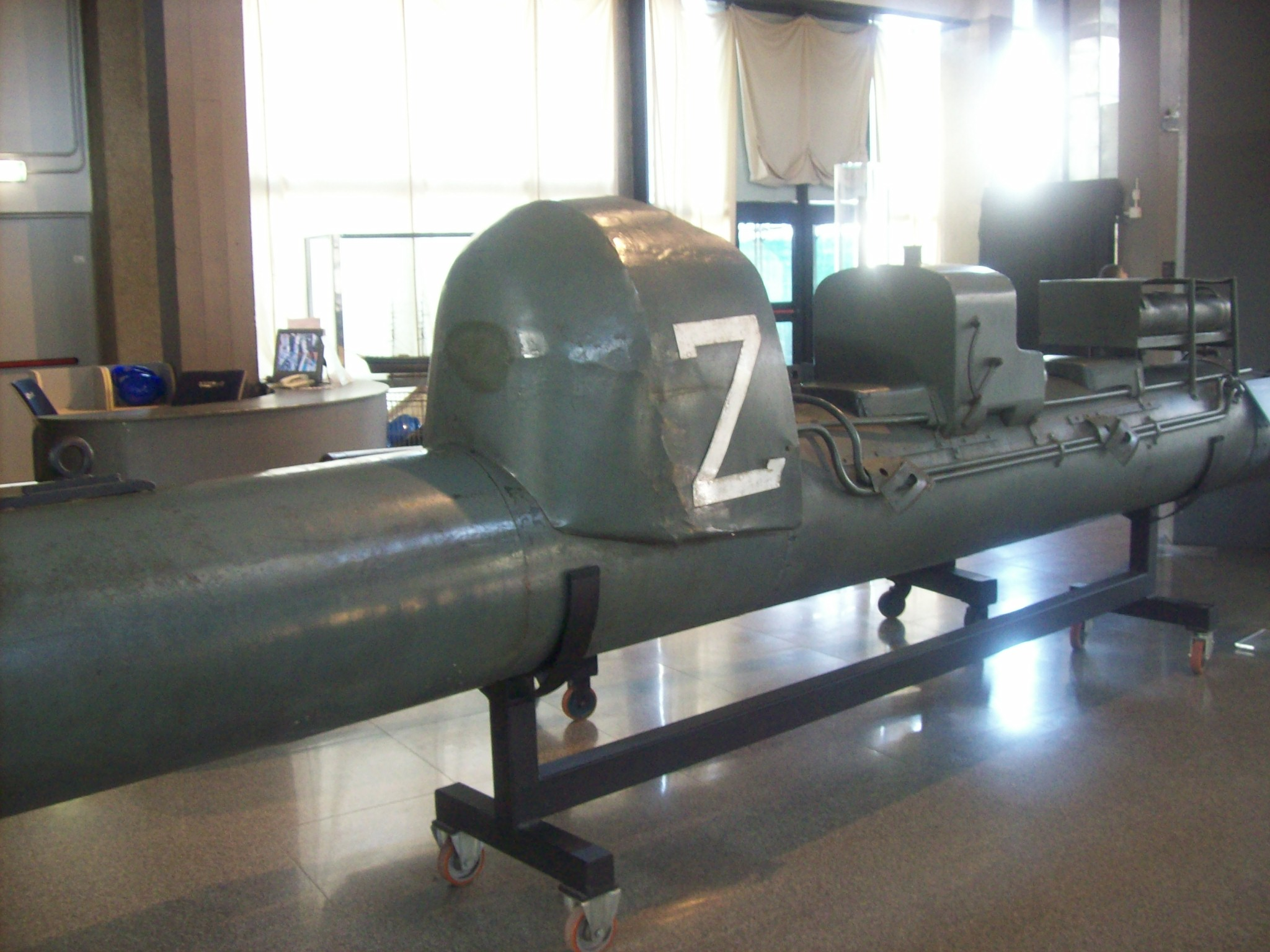
An Italian Human Torpedo

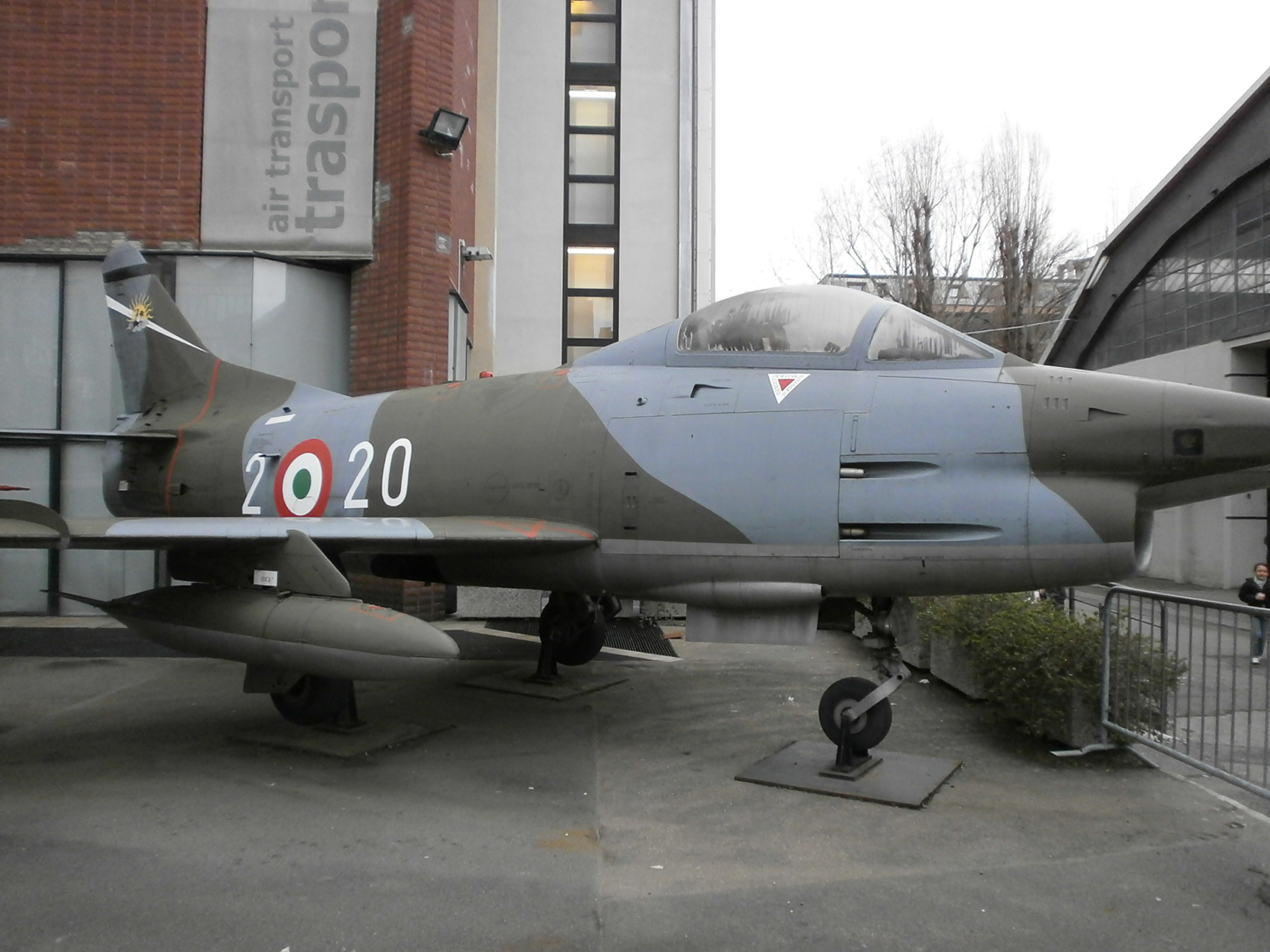
Fiat G-91R Fighter aircraft

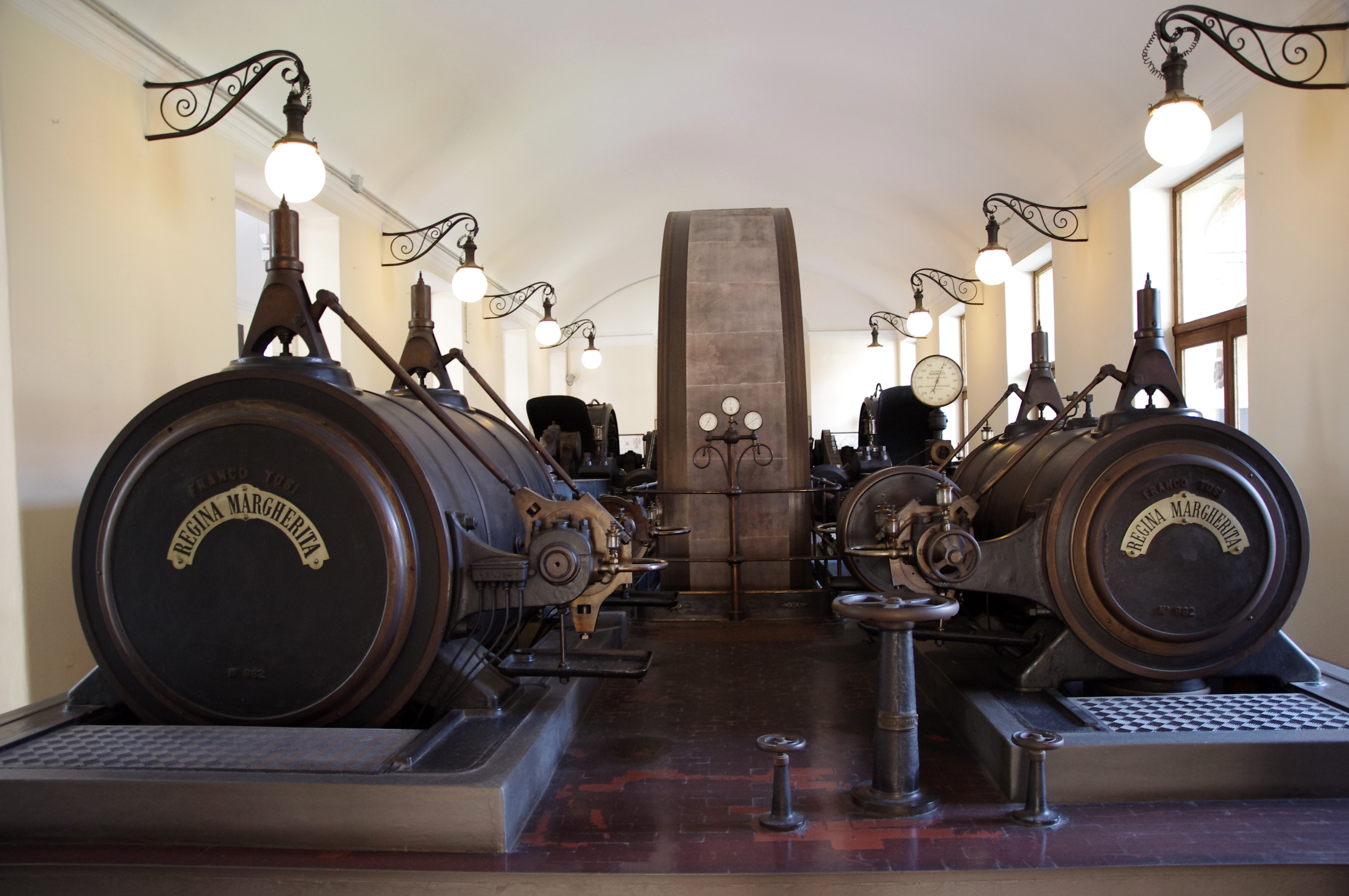
Regina Margherita Thermal Power Plant

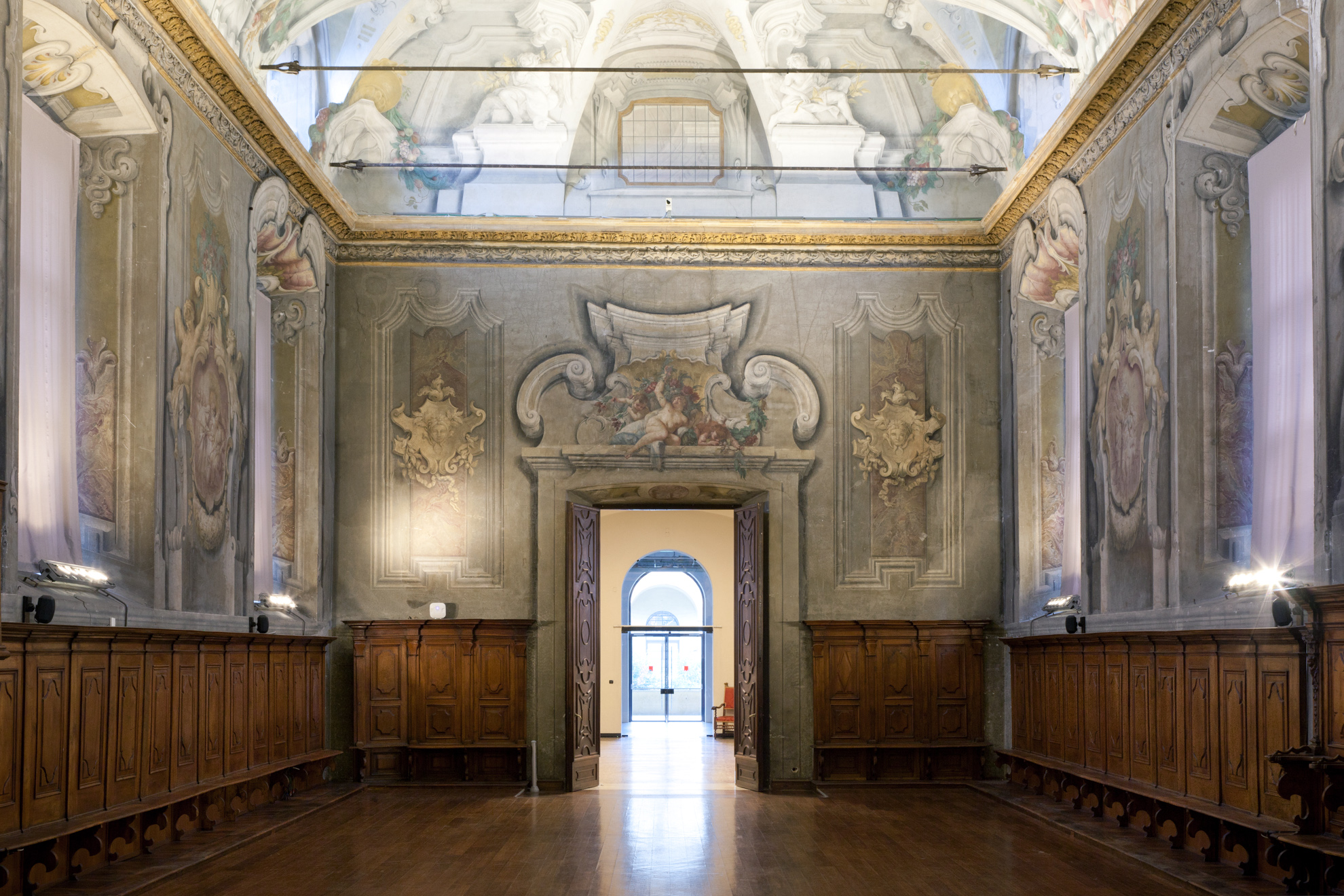
The Cenacolo hall, frescoed by Pietro Gilardi

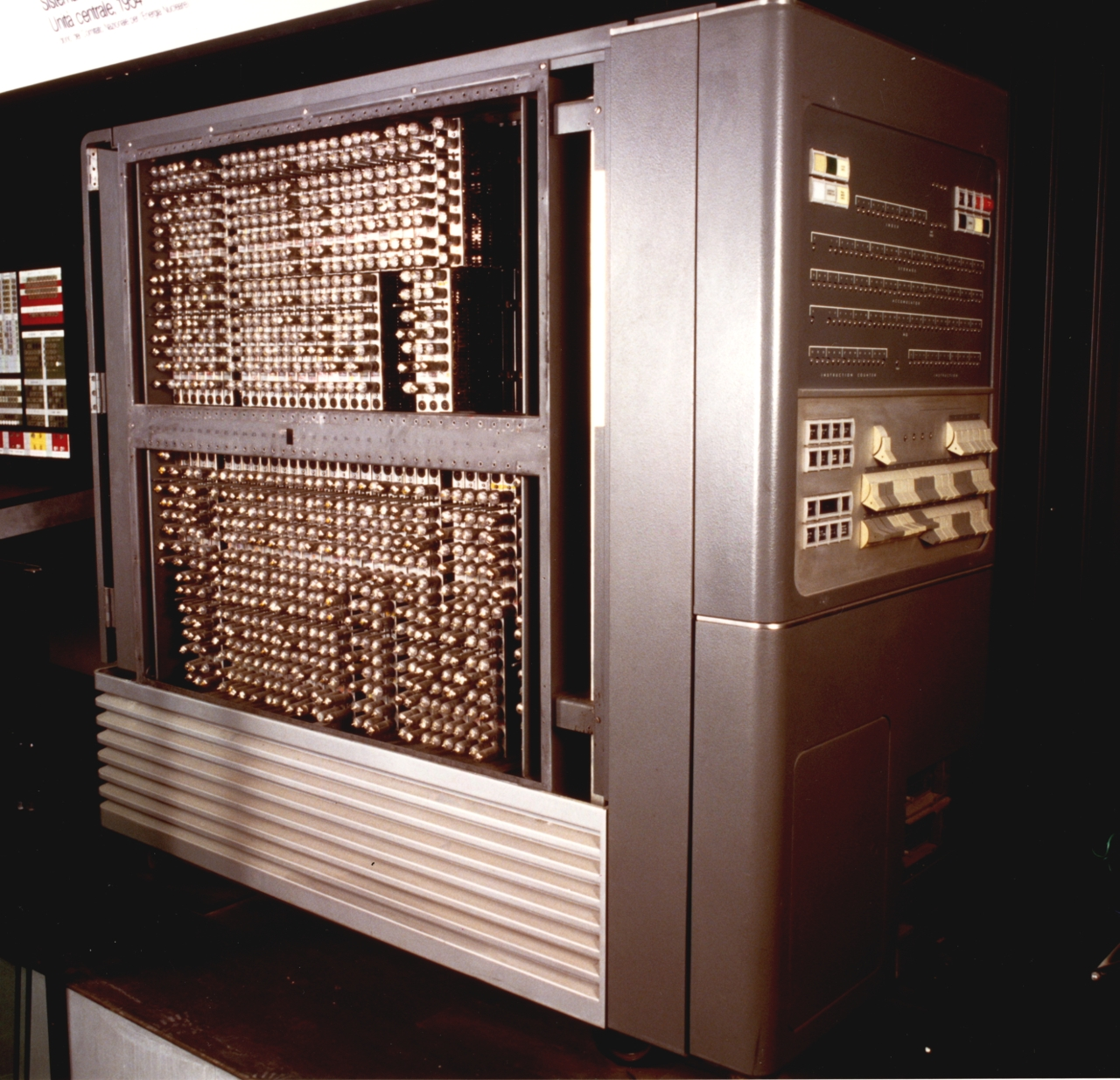
IBM 704

== See also ==
- Museo leonardiano di Vinci
  - Museo Ideale Leonardo da Vinci
- Leonardo3 Museum
- List of museums in Milan
- List of science museums in the world
