= Canadiana.org =

Canadian digital preservation organization

- Motto: Digitization. Preservation. Access.
- Established: 1978
- Affiliations: Canadian Association of Research Libraries, Library and Archives Canada, Bibliothèque et Archives nationales du Québec, University of Toronto, Toronto Public Library, University of Alberta
- Chairperson: Alan Shepard (CRKN); Rebecca Graham (Heritage Project)
- Location: (Canada) Ottawa, Canada
- Website: www.canadiana.ca

Canadiana.org, formerly the Canadian Institute for Historical Microreproductions, is a non-profit dedicated to preserving Canada's heritage and making it accessible online.

== History ==
The Canadian Institute for Historical Microreproductions (CIHM) was launched in 1978 by the Canada Council in keeping with the recommendations of the Commission on Canadian Studies (held by the Association of Universities and Colleges of Canada). The commission's report, To Know Ourselves, noted several major concerns for the development of Canadian research knowledge: the difficulty accessing Canada's published heritage, unevenly scattered across the country, and the deteriorating condition of material for which no preservation efforts had been made.

CIHM launched with the mandate to preserve Canada's older physical collections for future generations. The organization microfilmed materials to preservation standards, storing the masters at Library and Archives Canada and producing copies on microfiche for distribution to Canada's research libraries. By the late 1990s, the CIHM collection was held by 85 libraries and accessed by 100,000 users each year.

Canadiana.org initial launch included a 'Discovery Portal' which was a search platform built by harvesting the cataloguing information (metadata) from Canada's major digital libraries. The portal converted each type of metadata into a common format, allowing users to search 60 million pages of digital heritage material held by 33 Canadian research libraries, archives, and museums. One of the largest contributors was the University of Toronto. Described as "the Google of Canadian history," the portal broke ranks with most academic search platforms by streamlining its interface to appeal to the lay person.

On April 1, 2018, Canadiana.org merged with the Canadian Research Knowledge Network (CRKN). CRKN is a not-for-profit partnership of 75 Canadian universities that provides subscription service to early Canadiana online since 2006. As of January 1, 2019, Canadiana.org now provides open and free access to a large collection of full-text historical content about Canada, including books, magazines and government documents.

== Services ==
Early Canadiana Online (ECO) is a digital repository containing some 60 million pages of historical primary sources catalogued in 10 digital collections. The database was launched in 1999 at the University of Toronto's Thomas Fisher Rare Book Library with material digitized from the CIHM microfiche collection and a search engine developed at the University of Waterloo. The ECO collection initially covered four themes (English Canadian literature, travel and exploration, women's history, history of French Canada, and aboriginal history). The new database organization features three categories: monographs, periodicals, magazines and newspapers; and government publications. Some of the source material includes the digitization of the Jesuit Relations, the Hudson's Bay Company archives, Canada's early Official Publications, early Canadian periodicals, health and medicine journals, and Governors General's papers.

== Role in the history of hockey ==
In 2003, a Toronto-based hockey historian exploited ECO's search capabilities to trace the sport's origins back two decades earlier (and thousands of kilometres further west) than previously believed. The ECO collection featured a letter from Sir John Franklin's 1825 Arctic expedition containing the first known written reference to a game of hockey played on ice. Addressed to British geologist Roderick Murchison from Fort Franklin on the south shore of the Great Bear Lake, Rupert's Land (present-day North-West Territories), the letter read:

We endeavour to keep ourselves in good humour, health and spirits by an agreeable variety of useful occupation and amusement. Till the snow fell, the game of hockey played on the ice was the morning’s sport.

Several Canadian cities, including Montreal (whose Montreal Gazette published the first set of hockey rules in 1875), Halifax, and Windsor, claim the distinction of the "birthplace of hockey," while similar stick-and-ball games were common (and no doubt occasionally played on ice) to both Europe and North America in the early 19th century. Following the discovery of Franklin's passage on ECO, the town of Deline (site of the original Fort Franklin) officially added its claim.

== See also ==
- Europeana
- Mexicana
- Flandrica.be
