= Kelsey Museum of Archaeology =

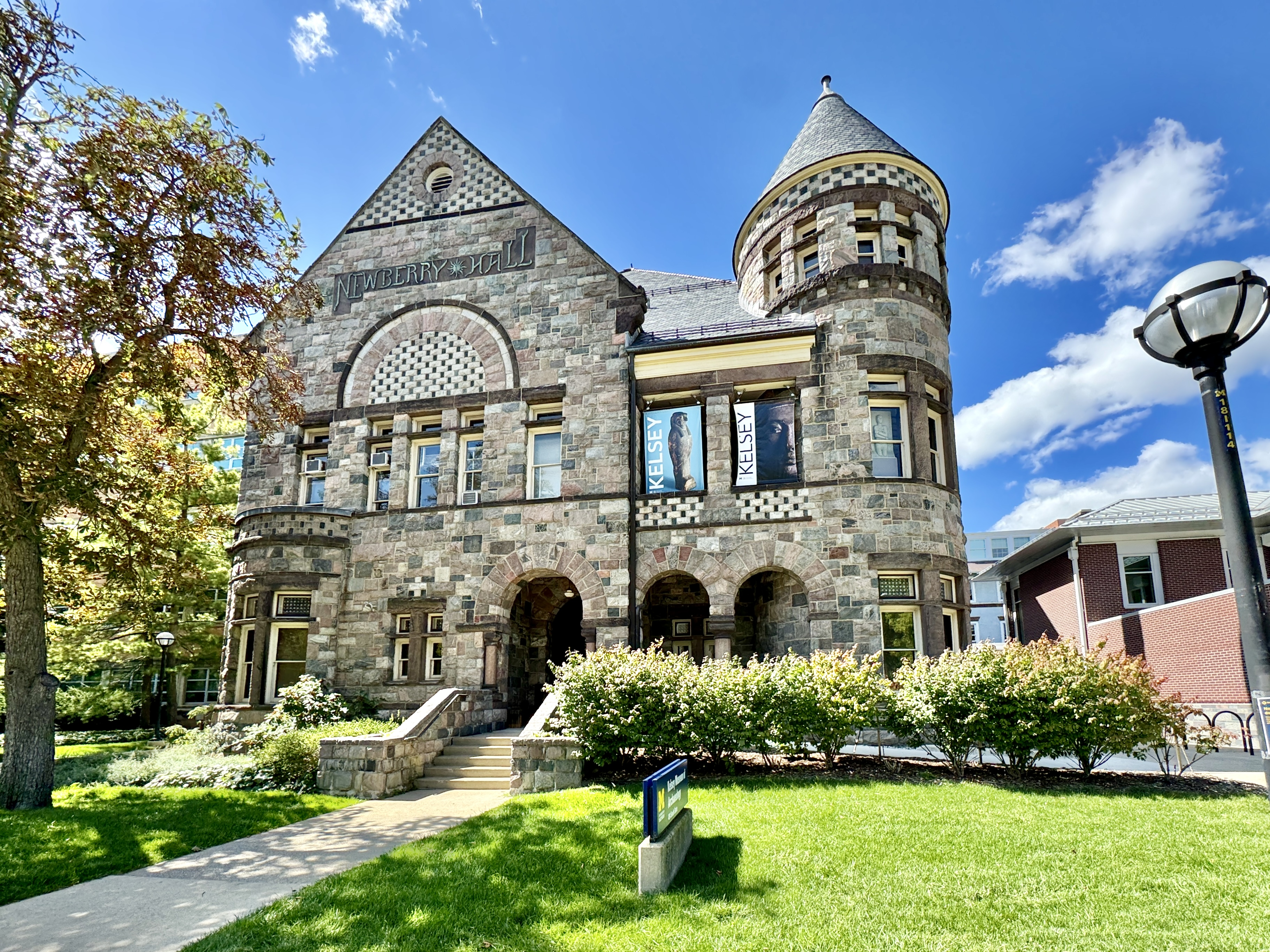
- Former name: Museum of Classical Archaeology
- Established: 1928
- Location: Newberry Hall; 434 S. State St; Ann Arbor, Michigan
- Type: archaeology museum
- Accreditation: American Alliance of Museums
- Collections: prehistoric through medieval times
- Collection size: >100,000
- Director: Nicola Terrenato
- Owner: University of Michigan
- Website: lsa.umich.edu/kelsey
- Newberry Hall
- U.S. National Register of Historic Places
- Michigan State Historic Site
- Location: 434 S. State Street; Ann Arbor, Michigan
- Coordinates: 42°16′36.7″N 83°44′26.″W
- Area: 1 acre (0.40 ha)
- Built: 1888
- Architect: Spier and Rohns (original building); Hammond Beeby Rupert Ainge Inc. (2003 addition)
- Architectural style: Richardsonian Romanesque
- NRHP reference No.: 72000660
- Added to NRHP: March 24, 1972

The Kelsey Museum of Archaeology is a museum of archaeology located on the University of Michigan central campus in Ann Arbor, Michigan, in the United States. The museum is a unit of the University of Michigan's College of Literature, Science, and the Arts. It has a collection of more than 100,000 ancient and medieval artifacts from the civilizations of the Mediterranean and the Near East. In addition to displaying its permanent and special exhibitions, the museum sponsors research and fieldwork and conducts educational programs for the public and for schoolchildren. The museum also houses the University of Michigan Interdepartmental Program in Classical Art and Archaeology.

== History ==
The history of the museum begins before the museum was established. The founder of the university's collection of artifacts was Francis Kelsey, a professor of Latin at the University of Michigan from 1889 until his death in 1927. Kelsey began acquiring artifacts in 1893 in order to help his students understand the ancient world. In 1893, he made his first acquisitions: 108 lamps, vases, and building materials from Alfred Louis Delattre, the Jesuit priest and archaeologist who was conducting an excavation at Carthage in Tunisia, and another 1,096 objects from dealers in Tunis, Rome, Capri, and Sicily. Together with several thousand coins donated to the University of Michigan in the 1880s, these objects formed the core of the university's archaeological collections. Kelsey continued to acquire objects (by gift and purchase) for the university until he died in 1927. These artifacts included pottery, terracotta figurines, painted stucco, inscribed tombstones, daily life objects, glass, tombs, and papyri.

In 1924, Kelsey secured funding for excavations at sites around the Mediterranean and began to ship a large number of artifacts back to Ann Arbor. In 1924, he sent nearly 45,000 objects from Karanis, illustrating "in detail how daily life was lived in Egypt under Roman rule." The same year, excavations at Seleucia-on-the-Tigris in Iraq yielded another 13,000 objects. In 1925, Kelsey commissioned the Italian artist Maria Barosso to paint a set of watercolor replicas of the murals of the Villa of the Mysteries at Pompeii, which now are housed in a special room in the Upjohn Exhibit Wing.

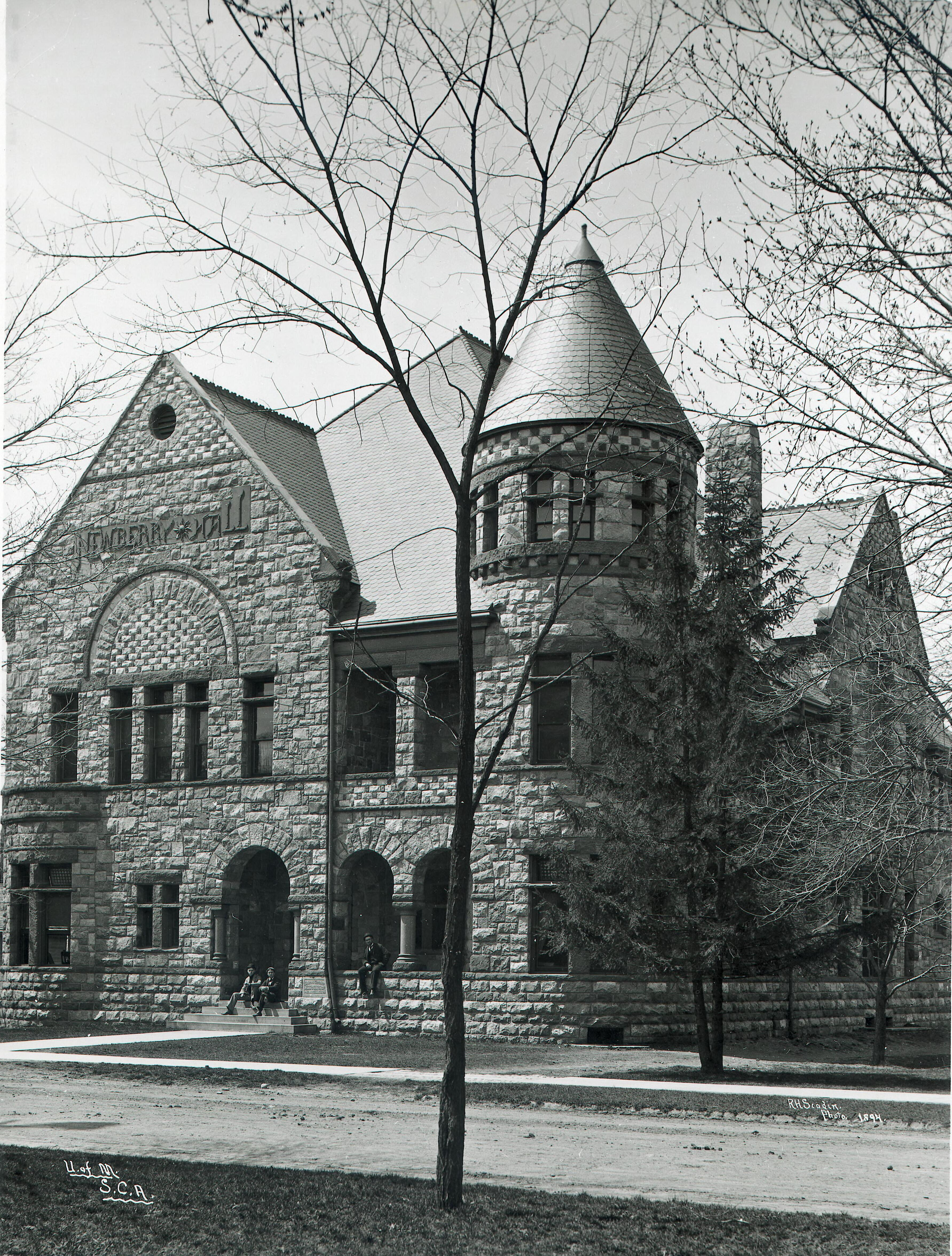
Newberry Hall in 1894

The building that now houses the museum was originally built for the Students' Christian Association for religious services and other meetings and activities. It was designed by the Detroit architectural firm of Spier & Rohns. Construction began in 1888 and was completed in 1891.

The building is described as a "massive, asymmetrical Richardsonian Romanesque building of rough-cut, randomly placed local fieldstone." The building has a hip roof broken by parapeted cross-gables, with a facade "dominated by a projecting three-story corner turret topped by a conical roof"; "decorative colonettes, arches, and regularly coursed variegated brick bandcourses break the heaviness of the imposing stone structure." The building was dedicated on July 21, 1891 at a cost of $40,000 and was named Newberry Hall—a name still engraved on the building's front—in honor of railroad magnate John S. Newberry, whose widow Helen Newberry contributed $18,000 toward the building's construction.

The university leased Newberry Hall in 1921 for classroom space, housed its collection of ancient artifacts there from 1928, and finally purchased the building in 1937. In 1953, the museum was named in honor of Kelsey. Newberry Hall was designated as a Michigan State Historic Site on August 13, 1971, and was added to the National Register of Historic Places on March 24, 1972. It is one of the oldest still-standing buildings on the University of Michigan campus.

By the early 1990s the museum was experiencing overcrowding, deterioration of artifacts, and lack of adequate storage space. It was closed in July 1993 for renovations and reopened in October 1994. During that time, a new third floor was added in space formerly occupied by a choir loft (from the building's Christian Association period) and a new climate-controlled Sensitive Artifact Facility and Environment space was added to maintain "appropriate storage, humidity, and temperature requirements for optimal artifact longevity." A new registry, conservation lab, objects study area, water-sprinkler fire control system, security system, and elevator to the new third floor were added. The building was also made more handicapped accessible. The $1.3 million project was funded by a $250,000 gift from Eugene M. and Emily Grant of New York City, along with grants from the University of Michigan and the National Endowment for the Humanities, as well as funding from the Kelsey Museum Associates and other private contributions.

In 2003, Edwin and Mary Meader of Kalamazoo, Michigan, longtime benefactors of the university, gave an $8 million gift to expand the museum by the addition of a new wing in the back of the museum. At the time, this was the largest gift in the history of the College of Literature, Science, and the Arts. The Meader gift, along with a $200,000 challenge grant from the National Endowment for the Humanities, covered all of the project's $8.2 million cost. The Chicago-based architectural firm of Hammond Beeby Rupert Ainge Inc. designed the new addition. In 2009, the William E. Upjohn Exhibit Wing was completed, adding more than 20,000 feet of study, storage, and display space in a climate-controlled facility; the new space allowed the museum, which previously had been displaying less than 1 percent of its collection, to dramatically expand the number of artifacts on public display. The wing was named after Mary Meader's grandfather William E. Upjohn, the noted pharmacist. The building reopened to the public in November 2009.

== Collection ==
The Kelsey Museum's permanent exhibition on display in the William E. Upjohn Exhibit Wing features many artifacts and artworks from the ancient and medieval world in the Mediterranean and Near East. The collection includes ancient Egyptian, Near Eastern, Greek, Roman, Etruscan, Coptic, Persian, and Islamic archaeological artifacts. In addition to its more than 100,000 artifacts, the collection is also home to some rare objects important to the study of archaeology, excavation records, and an archive of 25,000 archaeological and fine arts photographs."

Among the museum's most significant holdings are:

- Some 45,000 daily-life objects from the Graeco-Roman Egyptian town of Karanis, the largest in the world outside of the Cairo Museum.
- Around 8,500 items of Parthian pottery, one of the largest outside Iraq.
- Around 375 Latin inscriptions, the largest in the West.
- Around 5,900 early Byzantine and Islamic textiles.
- 1,300 provenanced glass fragments and vessels.
- More than 40,000 ancient coins, including ancient Greek coins.
- A nearly complete edition of the Description de l'Égypte produced during Napoleon's 1798 campaign in Egypt and Syria.
- A noted collection of Roman brick stamps.
- A collection of Egyptian mummy masks.
- 7,400 albumen prints and 25,000 archival photos related to late 19th- and early 20th-century Mediterranean archaeology.
- A large watercolor representation of the Villa of the Mysteries murals from ancient Pompeii.

The collection also includes a colorfully-painted ancient Egyptian mummy; amulets; a variety of glass vessels, ancient Greek pottery; and ancient Roman sculpture.

== Fieldwork ==
The Kelsey Museum has conducted fieldwork for nearly 100 years. Its past excavations and other fieldwork have taken place at the following archaeological sites:

- Antioch of Pisidia, Turkey: 1924
- Carthage, Tunisia: 1925
- Karanis, Egypt: 1924–35
- Dimé (Soknopaiou Nesos), Egypt: 1931
- Terenouthis, Egypt: 1935
- Seleucia-on-the-Tigris, Iraq: 1927–32, 1936–37
- Sepphoris, Israel: 1931
- Saint Catherine's Monastery at Mount Sinai, Egypt: 1958, 1960, 1963, 1965
- Qasr al-Hayr al-Sharqi, Syria: 1964, 1966, 1969–71
- Apollonia, Libya: 1965–67
- Cyrene, Libya: 1969, 1971
- Dibsi Faraj, Syria: 1972
- Tel Anafa, Israel: 1968-73, 1978–86
- Paestum-Poseidonia, Italy: 1981–86, 1995–98
- Coptos and the Eastern Desert, Egypt: 1987–95
- Leptiminus Archaeological Project, Leptiminus, Tunisia: 1990–99
- Pylos Regional Archaeological Project, Pylos, Greece: 1991–96
- Southern Euboea Exploration Project, Euboea, Greece: Michigan involvement: 1996, 2000, 2002, 2005
- The Vorotan Project, Armenia: 2005

The Kelsey Museum is currently sponsoring the following fieldwork:

- Abydos, Egypt: from 1995 - led by Janet Richards
- Tel Kedesh, Israel: from 1997 - led by Sharon C. Herbert and Andrea M. Berlin
- Gabii, Italy: from 2007 - led by Nicola Terrenato
- Aphrodisias, Turkey: from 2007 - led by Christopher Ratté
- Vani, Republic of Georgia: from 2009 (partnership between U-M and Institute for the Study of the Ancient World at New York University) - led by Christopher Ratté
- S. Omobono Sanctuary, Rome, Italy: from 2009 - led by Nicola Terrenato
- El-Kurru, Sudan: from 2013 - led by Geoff Emberling

== In popular culture ==
The indie rock band The Kelseys, formed in 2016 by University of Michigan students, is named after the museum.

== See also ==
- University of Michigan Papyrus Collection
