= Kristina Killgrove =

American bioarchaeologist, science communicator, and author

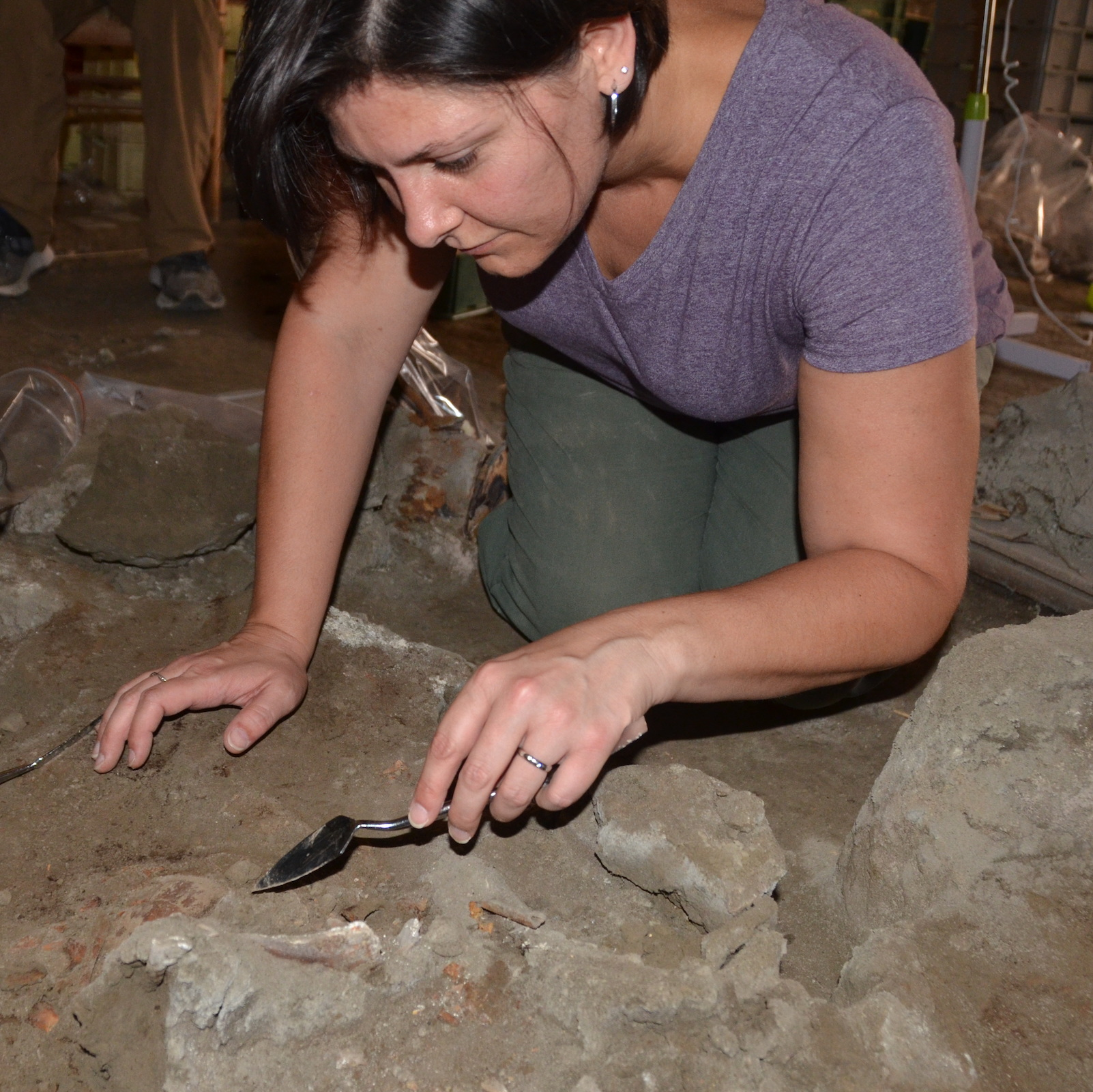
- Kristina Killgrove excavating at Oplontis, Italy.
- Born: March 10, 1977 (age 49)
- Education: University of North Carolina at Chapel Hill
- Children: 2
- Awards: Society for American Anthropology Excellence in Public Archaeology Award; American Anthropological Association New Directions Award for Excellence in Public Anthropology
- Scientific career
- Fields: Bioarchaeology, Roman archaeology, science communication
- Workplaces: University of West Florida, Vanderbilt University, SUNY Cortland, UNC Chapel Hill, Ronin Institute
- Thesis: Mobility and Migration in Imperial Rome
- Academic advisors: Nicola Terrenato
- Website: www.killgrove.org

Kristina Killgrove (born March 10, 1977) is an American bioarchaeologist. She has previously contributed and previously to Mental Floss, Science Uncovered, and Forbes, writing on anthropology, archaeology, and research about ancient Roman skeletons. From 2012 to 2018, she was faculty in anthropology at the University of West Florida and she has maintained an affiliation as a research scholar at the Ronin Institute since 2011. She is currently affiliated with the University of North Carolina at Chapel Hill.

== Biography ==
Killgrove grew up in Charlottesville, Virginia, where her father was employed as an engineer for the National Ground Intelligence Center and her mother was a nurse. She has one brother. She is a graduate of Albemarle High School and the University of Virginia, earning a B.A. with a double major in classical archaeology and Latin. Killgrove attended East Carolina University and earned an M.A. in anthropology, then attended the University of North Carolina at Chapel Hill, where she earned an M.A. in classical archaeology and a PhD in anthropology. She has taught college courses at the University of West Florida, Vanderbilt University, UNC Chapel Hill, SUNY Cortland, and Durham Technical Community College. Killgrove is married to Patrick Reynolds, a GitHub principal engineer and the Oracle of Bacon; they have two children. In 2019, she resigned her position as chair of the Society for American Archaeology (SAA) media relations committee to protest SAA's failure to eject an archaeologist accused of sexual harassment from their annual conference.

== Career ==
From 2010 to 2017, Killgrove worked on the human skeletal material recovered from the site of Gabii, under the aegis of a project headed by Nicola Terrenato. Since 2017, she has led a team working at the Vesuvian site of Oplontis.

Killgrove has written a blog, Powered by Osteons, since 2007. In 2013, she contributed to the 'Ask A Scientist' column of the short-lived British pop-sci magazine Science Uncovered. From 2015 to 2020, she was a contributor at Forbes, covering archaeology and anthropology news in her own column. In 2016, she began contributing occasional essays for Mental Floss and in 2022 she started writing for Live Science. Killgrove has won two awards for her science communication. She has also provided expert commentary for numerous media outlets, including CNN, the BBC, LiveScience, Gizmodo, Ars Technica, Newsweek, NPR, and Quirks & Quarks.

=== Awards ===
- 2017 – Excellence in Public Archaeology (Society for American Archaeology)
- 2016 – New Directions Award for Public Anthropology (American Anthropological Association)

== Academic publications ==
- Killgrove, K., and R. Tykot. 2018. Diet and collapse: a stable isotope study of Imperial-era Gabii (1st–3rd c AD). Journal of Archaeological Science: Reports. doi: 10.1016/j.jasrep.2017.05.054.
- Killgrove K. and J. Montgomery. 2016. All roads lead to Rome: exploring human migration to the Eternal City through biochemistry of skeletons from two Imperial-era sites (1st–3rd c AD). PLOS ONE 11(2): e0147585. doi: 10.1371/journal.pone.0147585.
- Meyers Emery, K., and K. Killgrove. 2015. Bones, bodies, and blogs: outreach and engagement in bioarchaeology. Internet Archaeology 39. doi: 10.11141/ia.39.5.
- Killgrove, K. 2013. Biohistory of the Roman Republic: the potential of isotope analysis of human skeletal remains. Post-Classical Archaeologies 3:41–62.
- Killgrove, K., and R. Tykot. 2013. Food for Rome: a stable isotope investigation of diet in the Imperial period (1st–3rd centuries AD). Journal of Anthropological Archaeology 32(1):28–38. DOI: 10.1016/j.jaa.2012.08.002.
- Montgomery, J., J. Evans, S. Chenery, V. Pashley, K. Killgrove. 2010. "Gleaming, white and deadly": lead exposure and geographic origins in the Roman period. In Roman Diasporas: Archaeological Approaches to Mobility and Diversity in the Roman Empire, H. Eckardt ed. Journal of Roman Archaeology supplement 78, Chapter 11, pp. 199–226.
