= Richard Upjohn Light =

American neurosurgeon and cinematographer

Richard Upjohn Light (1902–1994) was an American neurosurgeon, aviator, cinematographer, and former president of the American Geographical Society.

== Early life ==
After studying at Culver Military Academy, Light earned an undergraduate degree from Yale University in 1924 and a M.D. from the University of Michigan Medical School in 1928. He was the director of the surgical laboratory at the Yale School of Medicine from 1933 to 1935. From 1937 to 1968, he was a director of the Upjohn Company, the pharmaceuticals company founded by his grandfather, William E. Upjohn. In 1937, he married Mary Meader in Maryland.

== Photographic flight ==
Light was well known among flying enthusiasts for his 1934 around-the-world flight. While planning the trip, many parts of the world had not been photographed from above and the American Geographical Society encouraged photographic flights to build an archive of aerial views. His idea was to fly over areas of South America and Africa that had never been captured on film from the air and Meader was happy to go along with it.

Meader, Light's wife, had to take flying lessons and learn Morse code to become her husband's co-pilot, navigator, and radio operator. During training, she gave birth to her first son. In an interview with Encore Magazine in 2006, when asked why she decided to take the journey, she replied: "It just seemed like a great adventure – something I wanted to do. Why? I'm not certain, other than we both knew we would be doing something that hadn't been done before."

The two Lights took off out of Kalamazoo in September 1937 in a Bellanca monoplane, whose cabin lacked heat and pressurization. To survive, they had to breathe oxygen from a tank with wooden mouthpieces. Wearing a fur coat and a boot, Meader took photographs out of a window frame.

The Lights were banned from photographing Central America, Ecuador, and Colombia, to prevent the gathering of strategic knowledge. They, however, were allowed to take pictures over Peru, and took the earliest photographs of the Nazca lines. While unable to distinguish from the ground, from the air the designs range from simple patterns to hummingbirds and llamas.

After photographing South America, the couple crossed the Atlantic to Cape Town, South Africa. While there, she photographed the ice dome and crater of Mount Kilimanjaro and the glaciated pinnacles of Mount Kenya. In addition, her photographs include different views of native villages, urban areas, and the Egyptian pyramids, as well as several other subjects. On an average day they would rise at 4 a.m. and fly until 11 a.m, afterwich they would visit the farms, mines, and native settlements that would be photographed the next day.

The couple's original plan was to fly into Asia; however, this was not accomplished due to the damaging of the plane and Meader's pregnancy with a second child. The two returned to Kalamazoo in February 1938. In all, Meader took over 1,000 photographs in her two flights.

== Later life ==
After the flight, Light wrote the book Focus on Africa, which included his wife's photos and published by the American Geographical Society. The book was only the second which included aerial photos. A 1941 review of the book by Mary Jobe Akeley of the New York Times called the pictures "superb".

Light and Meader divorced in the early 1960s. He served as a member of the Yale University Council from 1956 to 1963 and was the founder of the Richard U. Light Foundation. In 1962, Light created an undergraduate scholarship awarded annually.
