= Edwin Meader =

American geography professor (1909-2007)

Edwin Meader (September 21, 1909 – February 1, 2007) was a geography professor at Western Michigan University and philanthropist.

Born in Benton Harbor, Michigan, Meader moved to Kalamazoo in 1925. He studied at Western Michigan University and the University of Michigan, from which he graduated in 1933. While serving in World War II, Meader visited a University of Michigan excavation area in Egypt, fueling his interest in geography and archaeology.

After the death of his first wife, Margaret, Meader married Mary Upjohn in 1965. The new couple donated millions of dollars to Western Michigan University, the University of Michigan, and various Kalamazoo charities. One of their largest gifts was the donation of $4 million to Western Michigan University. It resulted in the creation of the W.E. Upjohn Center for the Study of Geographical Change, after her grandfather. It digitizes maps and aerial photographs from all over the world and documents and evaluates geographic changes.

Meader died on February 1, 2007, at the age of 97. He was survived by his wife Mary, who died March 16, 2008.
