= Nicola Terrenato =

Italian scholar of ancient Italy (born 1963)

- Born: 1963 (age 61–62); Italy
- Occupations: archaeologist, museum director
- Employer: University of Michigan
- Known for: Gabii Project and Director of the Kelsey Museum of Archaeology

Nicola Terrenato (born October 22, 1963) is an Italian scholar of ancient Italy.

Terrenato was born in Rome.

A Classical archaeologist teaching in the Interdepartmental Program in Classical Art and Archaeology (IPCAA) at the University of Michigan in Ann Arbor Michigan, United States, Terrenato's expertise includes the Romanization of Italy and the archaeology of Etruria. He is the Director of the Kelsey Museum of Archaeology. He has excavated at Rome (Palatine Hill and Auditorium site), at Volterra and in the Cecina Valley, and in Basilicata. Terrenato is the director of the Cecina Valley Survey in Northern Tuscany. Since 2007, Terrenato has been director of the Gabii Project at the site of the ancient city of Gabii, approximately 18 kilometres (11 mi) east of Rome. His team completed two seasons of geophysical and topographical survey at the site (2007 and 2008), and began major excavations in June 2009. Excavations are ongoing and will continue in 2023. The Gabii Project has received support from the National Endowment for the Humanities as well as multiple other organizations for its continued research.

== Selected works ==
- F. Cambi and N. Terrenato. 1994. Introduzione all'archeologia dei paesaggi. Rome: Nuova Italia Scientifica.
- M. Munzi and N. Terrenato. ed. 2000. Volterra. Il teatro e le terme. Florence: Insegna del Giglio.
- E. Regoli and N. Terrenato. ed. 2000. Guida al Museo Archeologico di Rosignano Marittimo. Paesaggi e insediamenti in Val di Cecina. Siena: Nuova Immagine.
- N. Terrenato. ed. 2000. Archeologia Teorica. Florence: Insegna del Giglio.
- S. Keay and N. Terrenato. ed. 2001. Italy and the West. Comparative issues in Romanization. Oxford: Oxbow.
- P. Van Dommelen and N. Terrenato. ed. 2007. Articulating local cultures: Power and identity under the expanding Roman Republic. Portsmouth: JRA.
- N. Terrenato and D.C. Haggis. ed. 2011. State Formation in Italy and Greece: Questioning the Neoevolutionist Paradigm. Oxbow. (ISBN 978-1-84217-967-3)
- J. A. Becker and N. Terrenato. ed. Roman Republican Villas: Architecture, Context, and Ideology. (University of Michigan Press, 2011). (ISBN 978-0-472-11770-3)
- R. Opitz, M. Mogetta, and N. Terrenato, ed. A Mid-Republican House from Gabii. (University of Michigan Press, 2016). (ISBN 978-0-472-99900-2)
- N. Terrenato, The Early Roman Expansion into Italy. (Cambridge University Press, 2019). Winner of the 2021 Wiseman Book Award.
