= Mary Meader =

American photographer

Rachael Mary Upjohn Light Meader
- Born: April 15, 1916; Kalamazoo, Michigan
- Died: March 16, 2008 (aged 91); Kalamazoo, Michigan
- Occupations: Aerial photographer, explorer, and philanthropist

Rachael Mary Upjohn Light Meader (April 15, 1916 – March 16, 2008) was an American aerial photographer and explorer. Heir to the Upjohn Company fortune, she is best known in aerial circles for her 35,000-mile (56,000 km) flight in 1937–1938, during which she photographed unprecedented images of South America and Africa. Her African photographs were later featured in the book Focus on Africa. In her later years, she also became known in her native Kalamazoo, Michigan, for her philanthropy to Western Michigan University, the University of Michigan, and various Kalamazoo charities.

== Early life ==
Mary Meader was born to William Harold Upjohn and Grace Genevieve Bray Upjohn in Kalamazoo, Michigan, on April 15, 1916, a grandchild of Dr. W. E. Upjohn, the founder of the pharmaceutical Upjohn Company. Meader majored in French and Spanish at Smith College. She left the college in preparation for a marriage to the neurosurgeon Richard Upjohn Light, a first cousin of hers. Since the two could not legally marry each other in Michigan, they moved to Maryland, where they married in 1935.

== Flight ==
Dr. Light became famous among aviation enthusiasts due to his 1934 around-the-world flight. To celebrate his marriage to Meader, he wished to approximate the same, and Meader was happy to comply. During the planning of the trip, many points on Earth had not been captured on film from the air and the American Geographical Society promoted these photographic flights, as they were trying to build an aerial collection. Light's idea was to travel across areas of South America and Africa that had never been aerially photographed.

Meader took flying lessons and learned morse code so she could become her husband's co-pilot, navigator, and radio operator. During this training, her first son, Christopher, was born. In an interview with Encore Magazine in 2006, when asked why she decided to take the journey, she replied:

"It just seemed like a great adventure—something I wanted to do. Why? I'm not certain, other than we both knew we would be doing something that hadn't been done before."

The two Lights took off out of Kalamazoo in September 1937 in a Bellanca monoplane. Its cabin lacked heat or pressurization. To survive, they were forced to breathe oxygen from a tank out wooden mouthpieces. Wearing a fur coat and boots, Meader took photographs out of a window frame.

The Lights were banned from photographing all of Central America except Guatemala, Ecuador, and Colombia, as a safety measure against the gathering of strategic knowledge. They took advantage of the Peruvian government's allowal to take pictures in the air by capturing the earliest photographs of the Nazca Lines. These were unable to distinguish from the surface, though further into the atmosphere the designs can range from simple patterns to hummingbirds and llamas.

Following their photographing of South America, the couple crossed the Atlantic Ocean before arriving in Cape Town, South Africa. While there, she took a picture of the ice dome and crater of Mount Kilimanjaro and of the glaciars and pinnacles on Mount Kenya. Her photographs include different views of native villages, urban areas, and the Egyptian pyramids, among other subjects. Every day they would awake at 4 a.m., fly until 11 a.m, then visit some of the farms, mines, and native settlements Meader planned to photograph the following day.

The couple's original plan was to fly into Asia; however, this was not accomplished due to the damaging of the plane and Meader's pregnancy with a second child, Timothy. The two returned to Kalamazoo in February 1938. In all, Meader took over 2,000 photographs on her two flights.

== Later life and philanthropy ==
Three hundred twenty-three of Meader's African photos were included in Focus on Africa, a 1941 book written by her husband and published by the American Geographical Society. The book was only their second which included aerial photos; the first was Peru from the Air by George R. Johnson published in 1930. A review of the book by Mary Jobe Akeley of the New York Times called her pictures "superb". In addition, the photos have been featured in several exhibitions over the years.

Meader was a member of the Society of Woman Geographers since 1942, whom granted her the Outstanding Achievement Award for her pioneering aerial photography in 2005. Light and Meader divorced in the early 1960s. In 1965, Meader married Edwin Meader, a geography professor. The new couple settled on a farm outside of Kalamazoo, and according to Western Michigan University president emeritus Diether Haenicke, "for years their barn loft was one of Kalamazoo's foremost intellectual meeting places". They donated millions of dollars to Western Michigan University, the University of Michigan, and various Kalamazoo charities. Mrs. Meader traveled to an elementary school to teach children how to read into her 70s.

One of her largest gifts was her donation of $4 million to Western Michigan University. It resulted in the creation of the W.E. Upjohn Center for the Study of Geographical Change, after her grandfather. It digitizes maps and aerial photographs from all over the world and documents and evaluates geographic changes. She also donated $1 million gift to WMU's Waldo Library for a library renovation in the early 1990s and helped construct the W.H. Upjohn Rotunda, which was named after Meader's father. The Edwin and Mary Meader Rare Book Room was later dedicated to the library. The Meaders also gave $18 million to the University of Michigan, Edwin Meader's alma mater, in 2004 -- $8 million to U-M's Kelsey Museum of Archaeology, which was the largest gift ever to U-M's College of Literature, Science and the Arts, and $10 million to build a center for the study of depression, which was named the Rachel Upjohn Building after W.E. Upjohn's first wife.

On November 21, 2006, Meader was awarded the title of honorary member of the American Geographical Society and was invited to sign her name on its Fliers' & Explorers' Globe. This was part of a tradition spanning back to the 1920s in which noted explorers are asked to place their signature on the Globe. Meader was the 79th to do so. Other signers of the globe include Charles Lindbergh, Amelia Earhart, Sir Edmund Hillary, Robert Peary, Richard Byrd, and the astronauts on Apollo 8. Meader was one of only three people to sign it twice; across East Africa and the Andes.

Mary Meader died on March 16, 2008, in Kalamazoo at the age of 91. Her husband died one year before. Survivors include sons Christopher, Timothy, and John, of Kalamazoo, and Rudolph, of Ukiah, California; seven grandchildren; and five great-grandchildren.
