= Gabii =

Ancient city of Latium, east of Rome

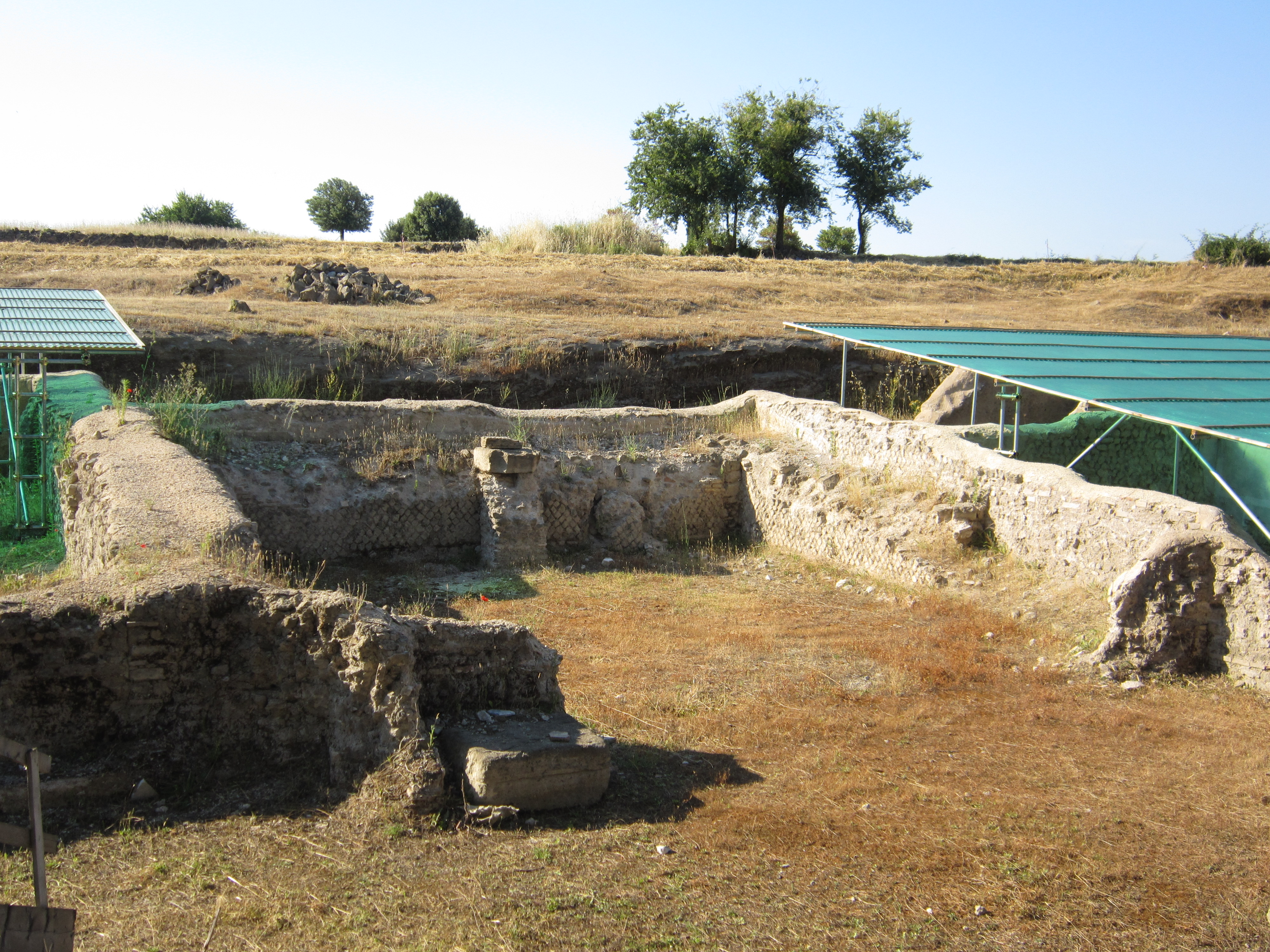
- Ruins in the residential quarter of Gabii

- Shown within Italy
- 41°53′13″N 12°42′57″E
- Type: Settlement
- Location: Osteria dell'Osa, Lazio, Italy
- Region: Latium

Site notes
- Management: Soprintendenza Speciale per il Colosseo, il Museo Nazionale Romano e l'Area Archeologica di Roma
- Website: Parco archeologico di Gabii (in Italian)

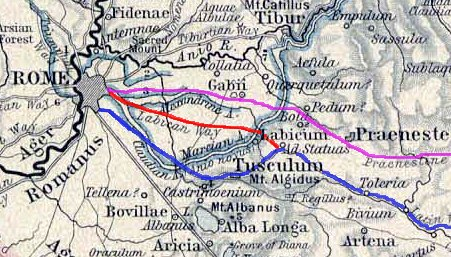
Ancient Latium. Gabii is directly east of Roma, south of Collatia.

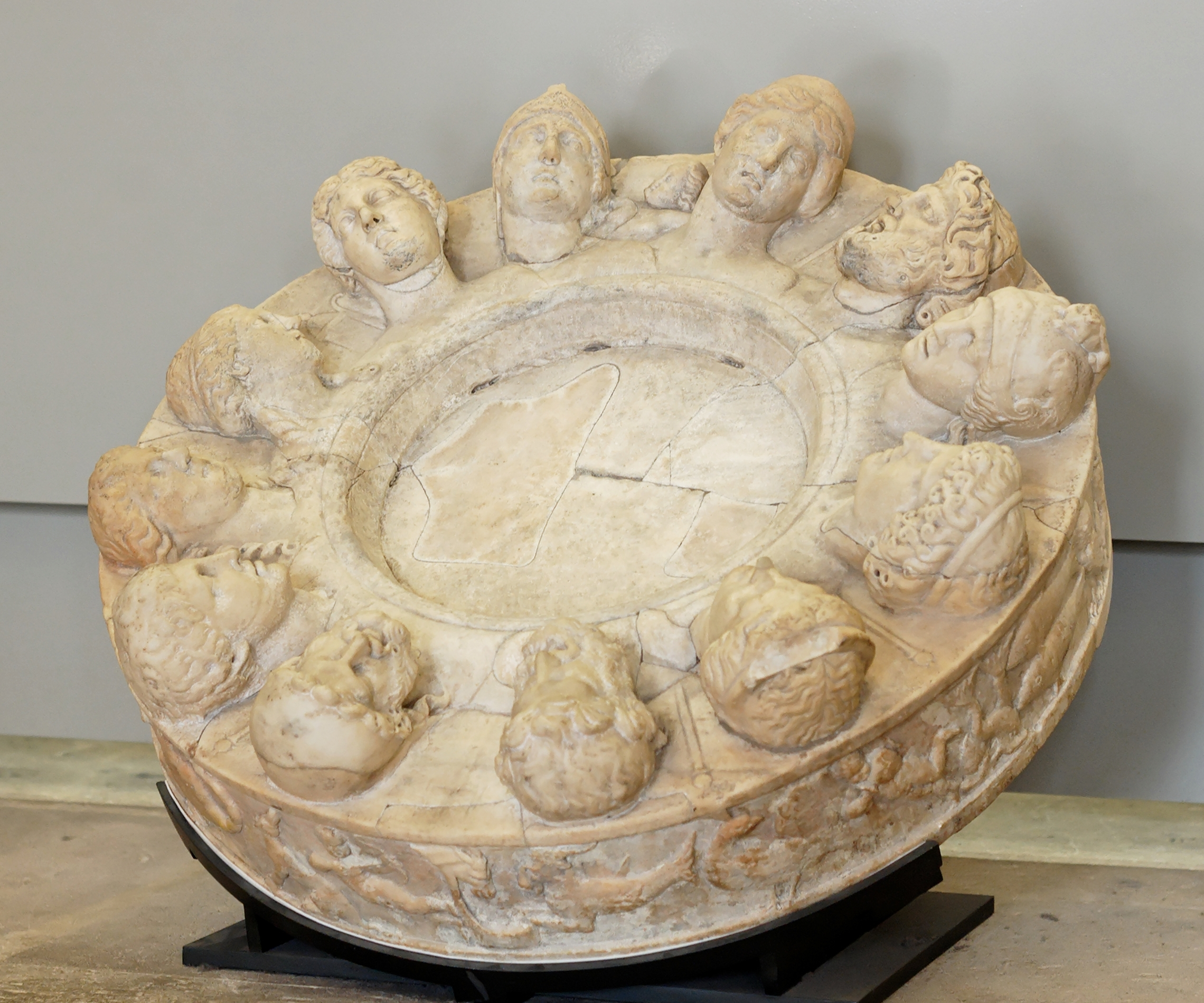
Altar of the Twelve Gods from Gabii, dated to 1st century AD (Louvre, Paris).

Gabii was an ancient city of Latium, located 18 km (11 mi) due east of Rome along the Via Praenestina, known in earlier times as the Via Gabina.

It lies within an archaeological park in which many remains have been recently unearthed.

Gabii was a renowned city and once a powerful rival to Rome, particularly during the early Republican period. In legend it was said to be the place where Rome’s founders Romulus and Remus were educated.

It was sited on the south-eastern perimeter of an extinct volcanic crater lake, approximately circular in shape, named the Lacus Gabinus, and then during later times called the Lago di Castiglione, "lake of the fortification", after Castiglione, a mediaeval tower erected on the site of the ancient acropolis, or arx, of Gabii. A necropolis is adjacent on that side of the lake. At present, the former lake is entirely agricultural land. Gabii is located in the frazione of Osteria dell'Osa 10 km (6.2 mi), in the Province of Rome, Region of Lazio.

== Historical geography ==
Some of the earliest settlement was in the crater of Lacus Buranus. Two streams flowing north to south flanked the lake on the west: the Fosso del'Osa, and the east: Fosso di San Giuliano. These originated in another body of water, believed to be Lacus Regillus, on the south side of the road. The streams cut the road on either side of Gabii and were crossed by bridges; in other words, Gabii was constructed at a defensible location on an isthmus between two lakes. The quadrangle so formed contained its own water supply and straddled a major route on the east flank of Rome. The two streams flow north to the Anio river, which flows west into the Tiber river on the north side of Rome.

The draining of the lake was a project of the Borghese family, which had purchased it in 1614 from the Colonna family.

An 1846 topographic work reports that the Osa came from "a large marshy plain, extending almost to the Via Labicana." Passing by Lake Gabino it was connected to the latter by "artificial canals", which were in the process of draining the lake:

The water of the lake has been very much lowered by this canal, and more draining is yet in contemplation, although there are already many square miles of uncultivated ground in the vicinity.

Octavian Blewitt's handbook was able to report in 1850:

The lake was drained a few years ago by prince Borghese, who has converted it from the state of a pestilential marsh into a district of great fertility.

Near the river a small inn had been built, the Osteria dell'Osa ("Inn of the Osa"), north of which was the main necropolis of Gabii. The habitation today has expanded into the centre of a frazione.

=== Lake Regillus ===
The basin with a marshy plain is the last trace of the quasi-legendary lake. It is now mostly agricultural land, except that the community of Lago Regillo has been placed in it near Gabii. Osteria del Finocchio marks the western limit, which is heavily settled and is on higher ground. The Battle of Lake Regillus decided whether the Roman Republic would continue or the kings of Rome would be restored by the intervention of the Latin League, to which Gabii belonged. The site of the battle is still a matter of dispute, which, on the unwarranted assumption that the location of the battle reveals the location of the lake, has extended into a dispute over the location of the lake. To modern topographers the deep lake basin, now kept dry, and the aqueducts that drew water, and still draw water, from its sources leave no doubt that the lake was located in the basin.

Lake Regillus varied in size and depth over the centuries but was certainly between the Via Labicana and the Via Praenestina east of Finocchio and north of Colonna (ancient Labicum), the last remnant at Pantana Borghese having been drained by the Borghese family in conjunction with the restitution of the first part of the Acqua Alexandrina as the Acqua Felice under Pope Sixtus V in the years 1585–1587. The two roads joined on the outskirts of Rome. The Pantana was the low point; from springs on its hillside exuded the water that filled the lake. During the thousand years of the post-classical period a much smaller Rome had lived on a greatly reduced water supply due to the broken and unrepaired aqueducts.

== Prehistory ==
Scattered surface pottery from the Middle Bronze Age has been found outside the necropolis located below Castiglione, from which nothing can be deduced concerning the settlement at Gabii. The Late Bronze Age is missing. The Final Bronze Age is represented by minimal Latial I (1000-900 BC) material around the inside of the crater on the southern side, indicating low-density settlement at the water's edge there.

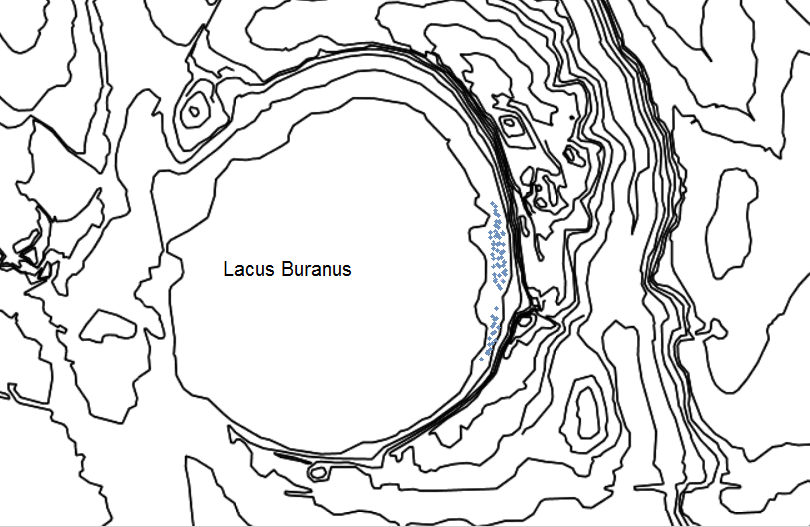
Bronze Age findings around Lacus Buranus

Definitive settlement at Gabii is believed to have begun with Latial IIA (900-830 BC) when the cemeteries of Castiglione, some 60 tombs of only IIA, and Osteria del'Osa, over 600 tombs primarily of II and III (900-630 BC), and some of IV (730-580 BC), began. Both of these necropoli are dated entirely before the foundation of Rome and well before the classical city of Gabii. The location of the settlements producing these cemeteries was an issue of some mystery until aerial reconnaissance revealed a string of six "Iron Age hamlets" on the isthmus and more along the ridge to the east. Latial IIA is regarded as pre-urban and IIB as proto-urban; that is, at some time during 830-730 BC the settlements acquired a common geopolitical identity. By the end of IV (580 BC) the name Gabii must have been in place as the name of the city, as by then the history was well into the events of its legends.

The most archaeological work has been done on the cemetery of Osteria dell'Osa. The tombs are divided into 14 groups, each exhibiting a set of distinctive traditions and each believed to represent one community of roughly 100 persons, round numbers. The earliest two, contemporaneous and dated to IIA, termed the northern and southern groups from their location within the cemetery, evidence the presence of a male warrior class. At the center of the cluster is a small set of male-only cremation burials, some in hut-urns. Around them is a greater group of inhumations of men, women and children. The richer cremation burials included grave gifts of miniaturized bronze tools and weapons and miniaturized pottery forms. The inhumations lacked weapons. Women were buried with jewelry and spindle-whorls (used in weaving).

The northern group (25 tombs) covered the mouth of the burial jar (dolium) with a travertine slab, made ovicaprine food offerings, left serpentine fibulae, razors of quadrangular shape and spearheads with sockets for wooden handles. The pottery is decorated. The southern group (30 tombs) used an impasto lid on the burial jars, left serpent-fibulae of a different-style, a razor of lunate shape and one-piece cast spears. The pottery is undecorated.

Urbanization of the area probably did not begin before the start of the second half of the 8th century BC. This process most likely finished by the end of the 7th century BC, and, at its height, the city's borders enclosed 0.75 square miles (1.9 km^{2}).

== Legend and legendary history ==
The early date of the prehistoric Gabii suggests that the Roman writers could have little traditional memory of its foundation or of who founded it. The surviving traditions are therefore in the legend category; there may or may not be elements of truth in them. The tradition is two-fold: Gabii was founded either by the Latin kings of Alba Longa (according to Vergil and Dionysius of Halicarnassus) and therefore was aboriginal Latin in ethnic descent, or by the Sicels as the Siculi, a substrate population of east Italy expelled by the Italics to Sicily. They became one of the three major indigenous tribes of ancient Sicily, giving their name to it.

The legend of a Siculian foundation of Rome comes from fragments of early Roman annalists, who asserted that the Siculi occupied several cities of Latium before the arrival of the aborigines (Latins): Rome, Tibur, Fescennium, Falerii, Antemnae, Caenina and a few others. Gabii is mentioned as one of them by Gaius Julius Solinus. According to him two Siculian brothers founded it and named it by combining their names, Galatus and Bins. Fanciful etymologies such as the above are not taken seriously but there is a sober case for a Sicilian and Siculian influence on early Latium. For example, the Cloelii claimed to be from Alba Longa and used the cognomen Siculus. Prisons called lautumia were cut into the sides of the early Capitoline Hill. Syracuse used quarries, called latomiai, for a similar purpose. Most of the similarities can be attributed to an influence on early Rome from Greek Sicily; however, the case of a Sicul substrate also is possible.

Plutarch relates the legend that Romulus and Remus were raised by Faustulus, the servant of Amulius, in Gabii, where they learned everything from literature to the use of Greek weapons. From there they went on to found Rome.

=== War with Rome under Tarquinius Superbus ===
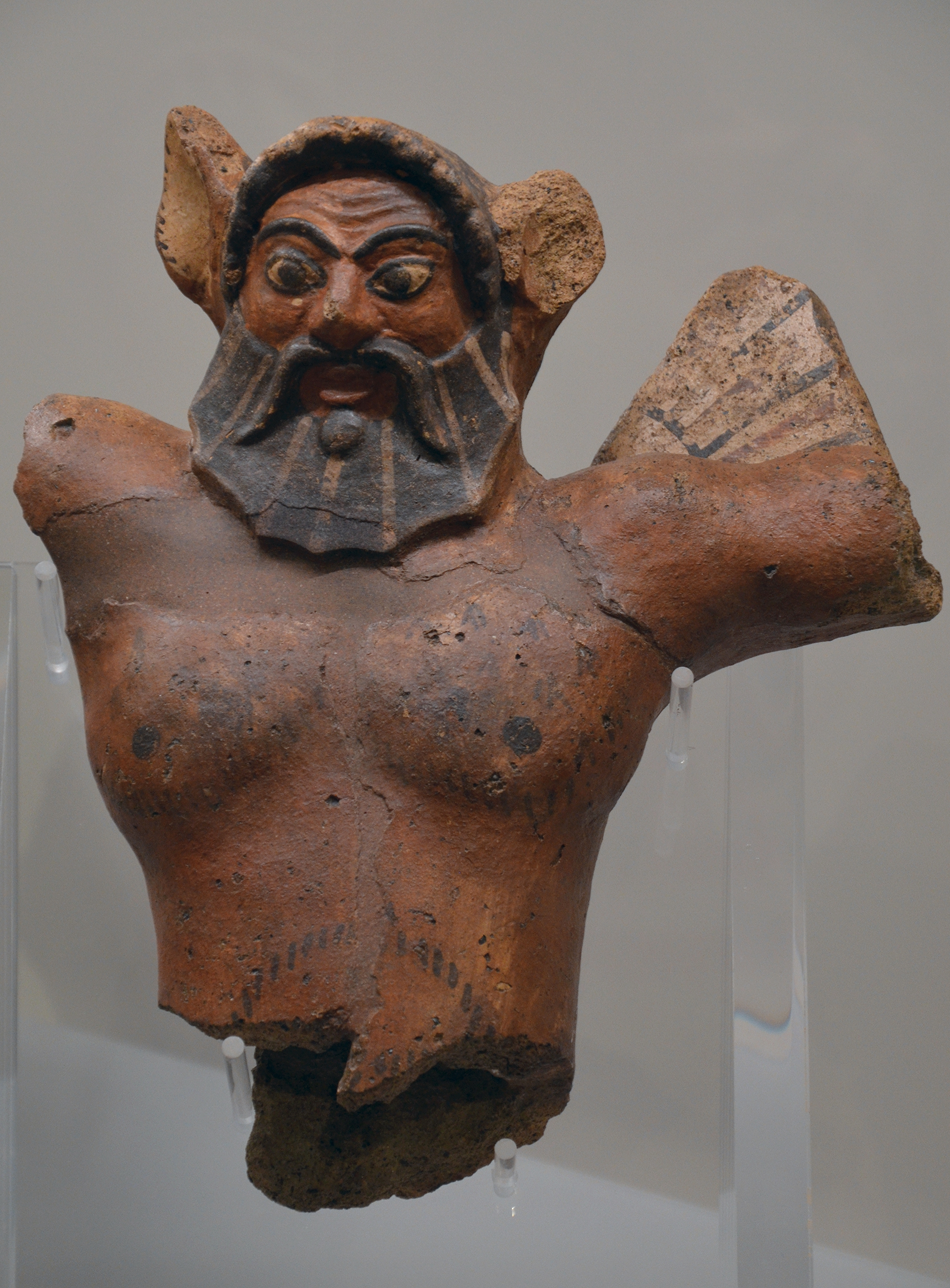
Terracotta of Typhon the "Father of All Monsters", 6th century BC (National Museum of Rome)

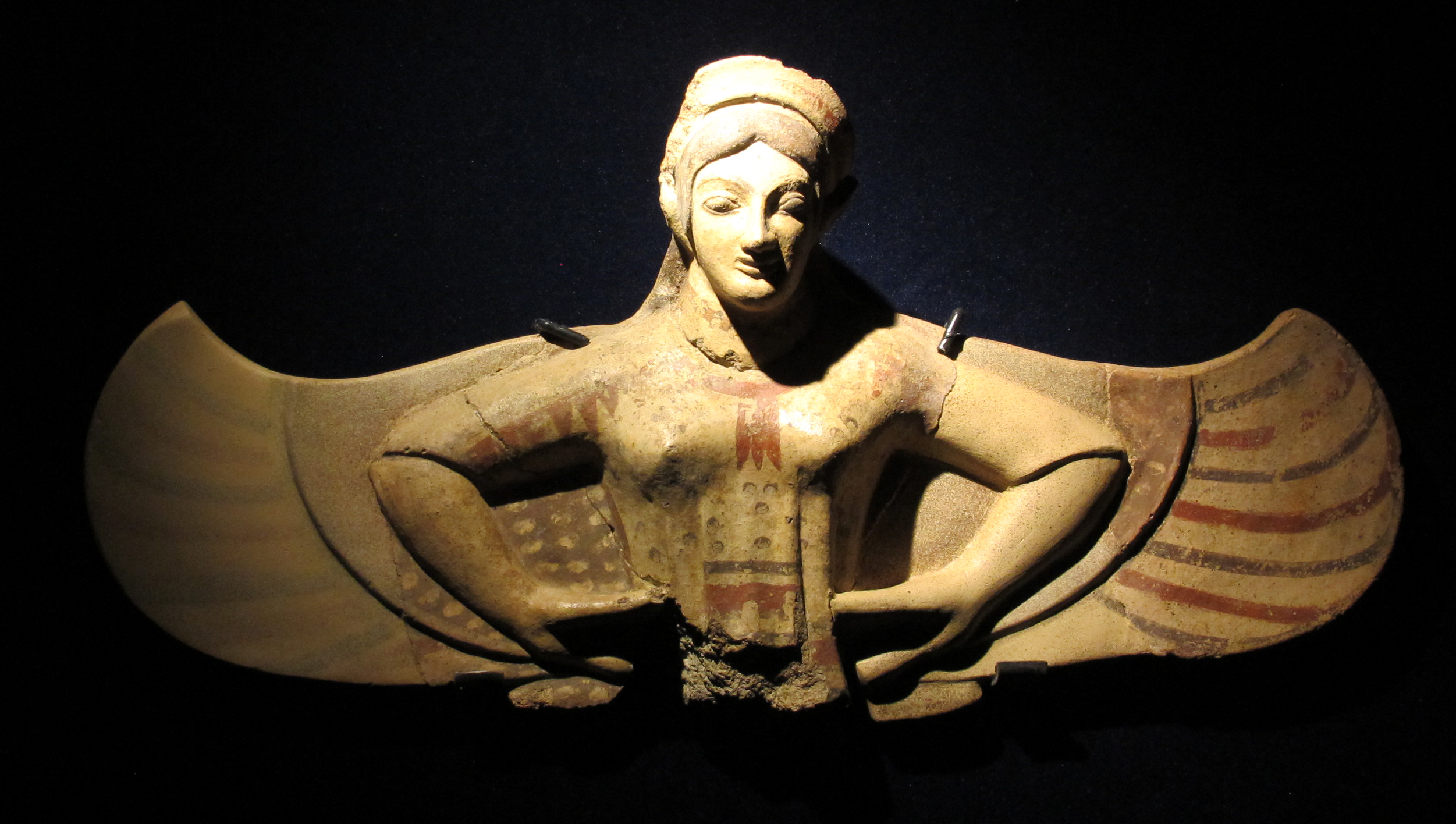
Terracotta of a harpy or siren, early 5th c. BC (Museum Villa Giulia)

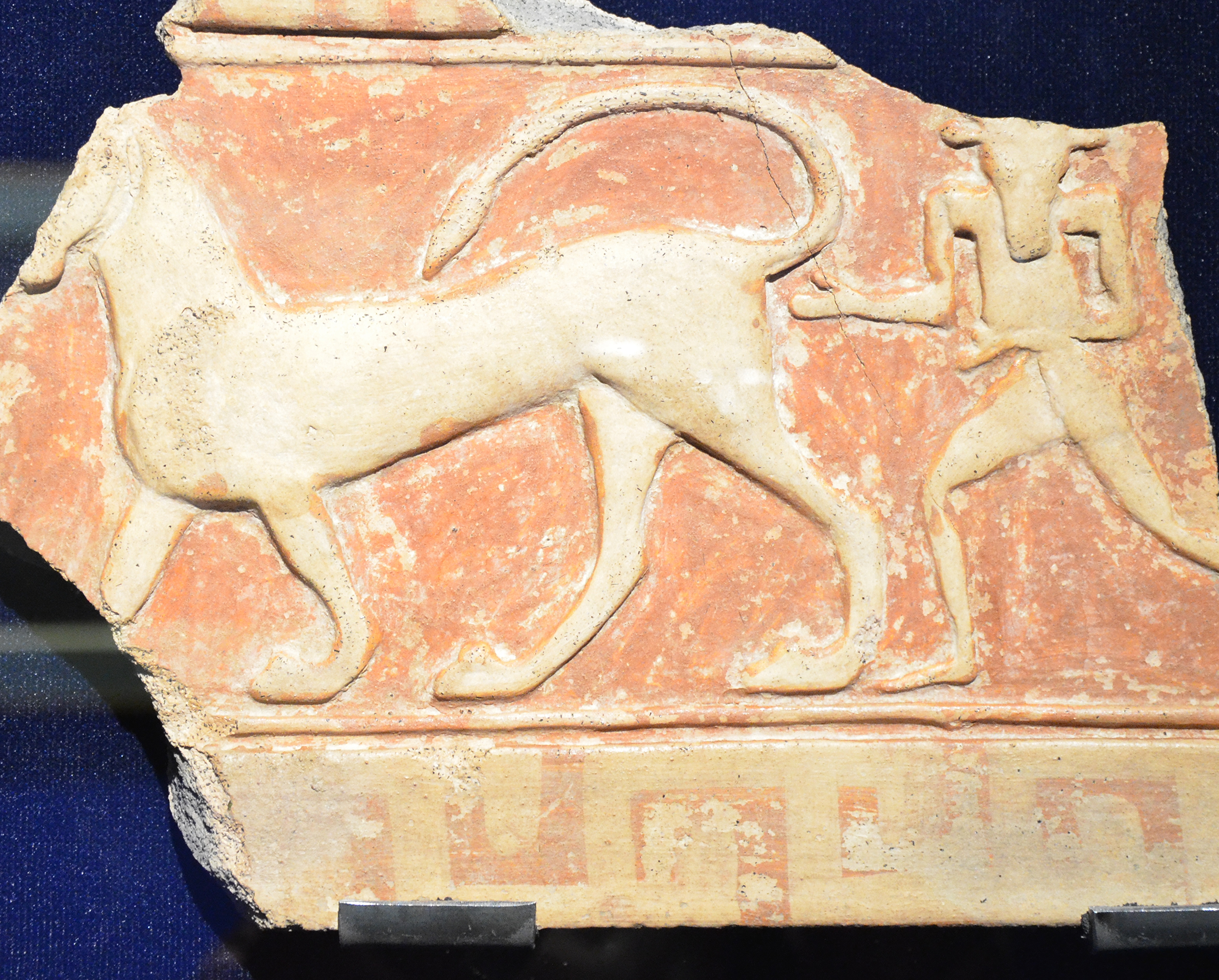
From a frieze with Minotaur and felines, 6th century BC

The Latin League was brought under Roman jurisdiction by the last king of Rome, Lucius Tarquinius Superbus. Addressing their council and claiming that Rome had a legal claim over the Latins, because all the Latin cities were founded from Alba Longa and Tullus Hostilius had made a treaty by which Alba was ceded to Rome along with all its colonies, he offered them protection from any chance devastation that should inflict their country and a share in Roman prosperity if they would resume the treaty, which they did. Thenceforward Latin troops fought beside Roman within the Roman army.

Gabii later reneged from the Latin treaty with Rome. Tarquinius' son, Sextus Tarquinius, went to Gabii, pretending to be in revolt against his father and asking for assistance. He was accepted, and after successfully commanding various military expeditions, he was appointed as the leading general of the army of Gabii. As general, he commanded a number of minor but successful skirmishes against Roman forces, with the complicity of the Roman king.

He sent a message to the king asking what to do next. Receiving the messenger in the garden the king said nothing at all (for which he might have been held liable later) but strolled around lopping off the heads of the tallest poppies with a stick. Sextus took this to be a message to destroy the aristocrats of Gabii including Antistius Petro whom according to legend Sextus accused of plotting with Tarquinius Superbus Sextus' return to Rome dead or alive, thereby provoking the Gabines to stone Antistius to death. Tarquinius Superbus was able to take advantage of the ensuing confusion and bring Gabii into submission without battle.

Dionysius of Halicarnassus states that Tarquin was lenient with Gabii, and their subsequent treaty, whose original text was written on a bullock's skin and draped over a wooden shield, was said by Dionysius of Halicarnassus to be still extant in his day in the Roman temple of Sancus.

After the overthrow of the Roman monarchy, Sextus fled to Gabii but was killed by the leaders of the city in revenge for his past actions.

== History under Roman control ==
Gabii was an ally of Rome after 493 BC. It became depopulated in the late Republican period due to the extensive use of the lapis Gabinus quarry, which was just under the archaic city. Cicero mentioned it in the 1st century BC as a small and insignificant place.

The Augustan poets used Gabii when demonstrating a city that had fallen from its old heights. However, from inscriptions we learn that from the time of Augustus or Tiberius onwards it enjoyed a revival and municipal reorganisation. Its baths were well known, and Hadrian, who was responsible for much of the renewed prosperity of the small towns of Latium, appears to have been a very liberal patron, building a senate-house (Curia Aelia Augusta) and an aqueduct. Many superb statues from the Imperial period, which would have adorned public buildings, have been recovered from the forum area.

After the 3rd century, Gabii practically disappears from documented history, though its buildings were still in use and its bishops continue to be mentioned in ecclesiastical documents till the close of the 9th century.

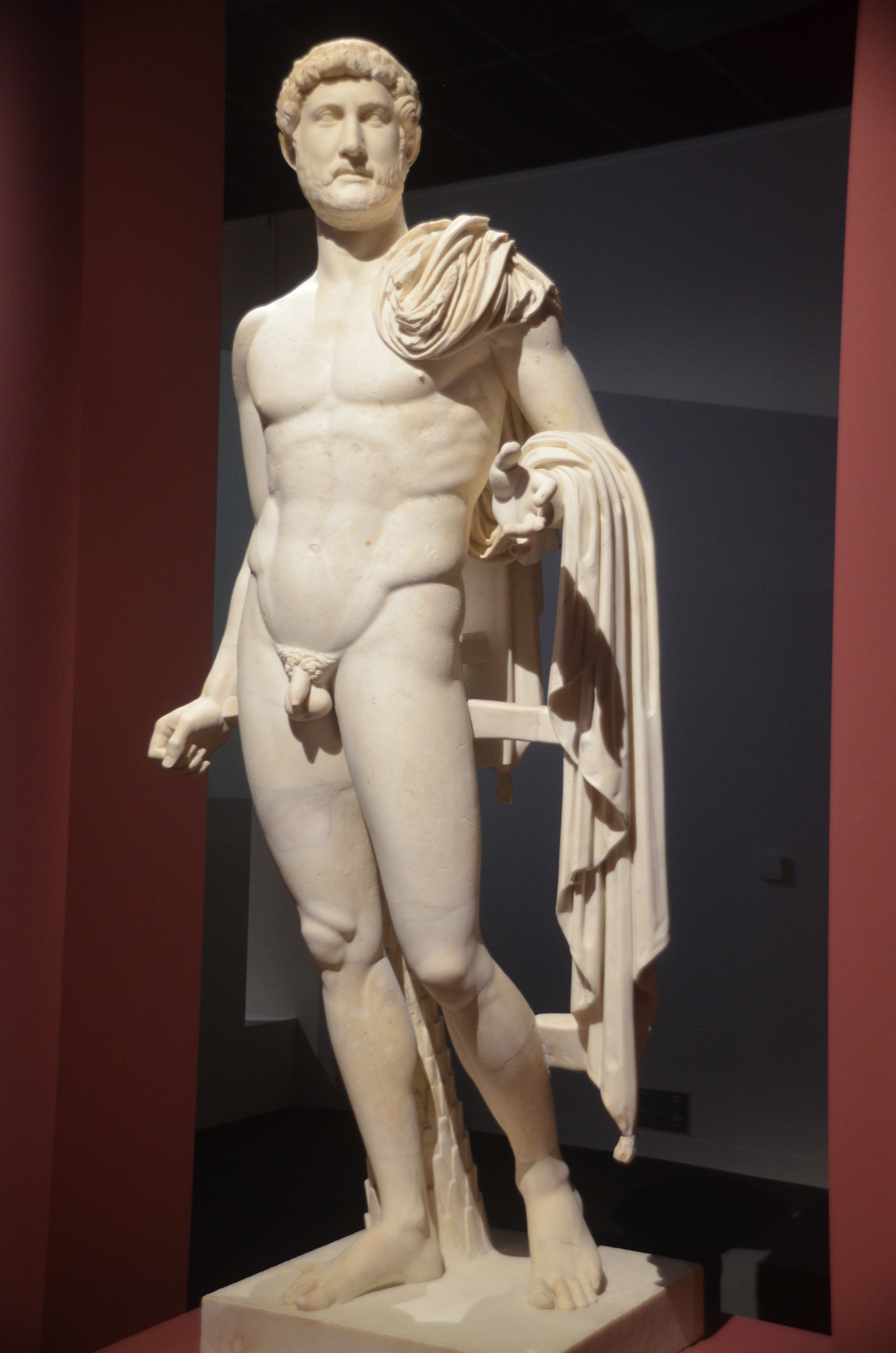
Hadrian as Diomedes (Louvre)

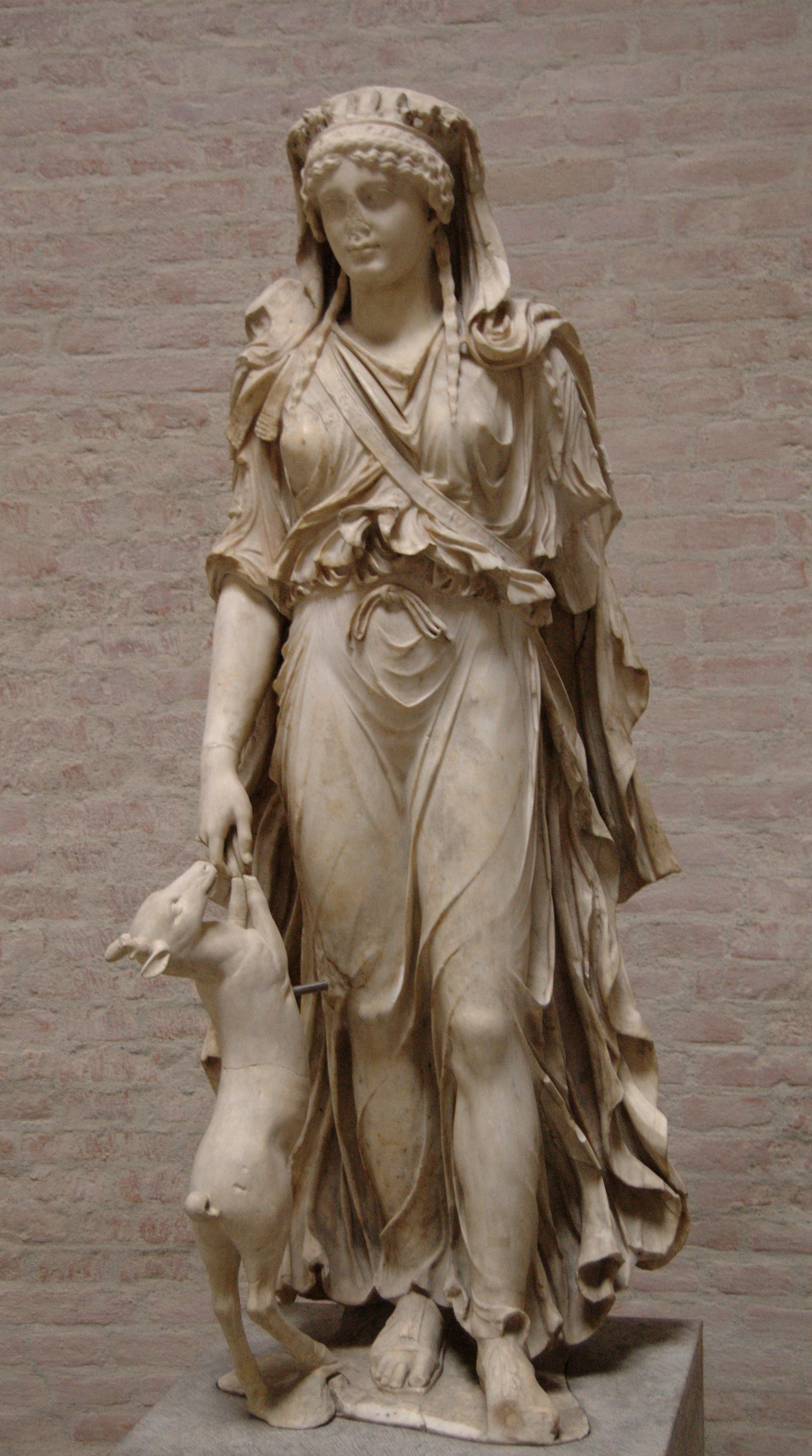
"Braschi" Diana (Glyptothek Munich)

Trajan (Musée des Amériques)

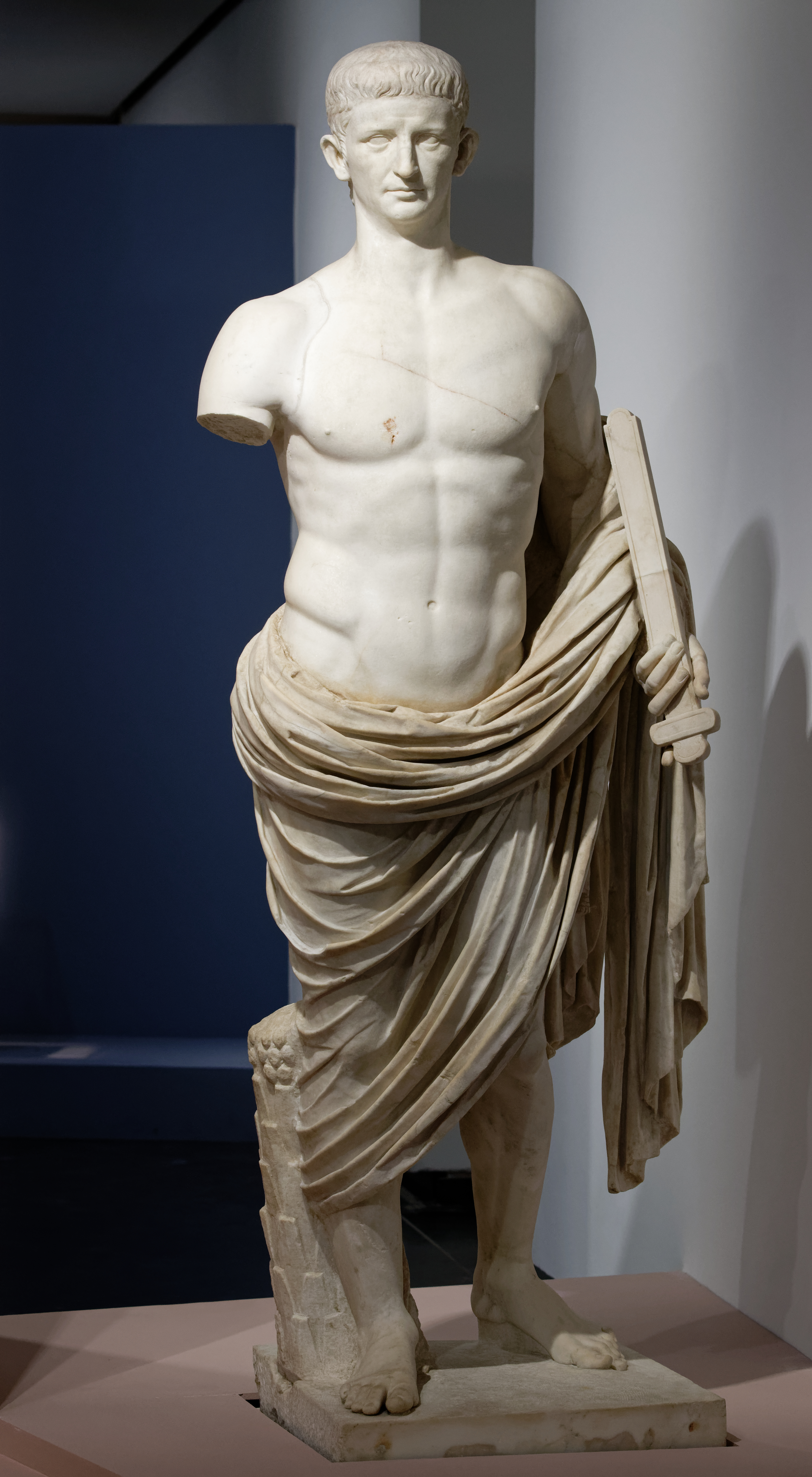
Claudius (Louvre)

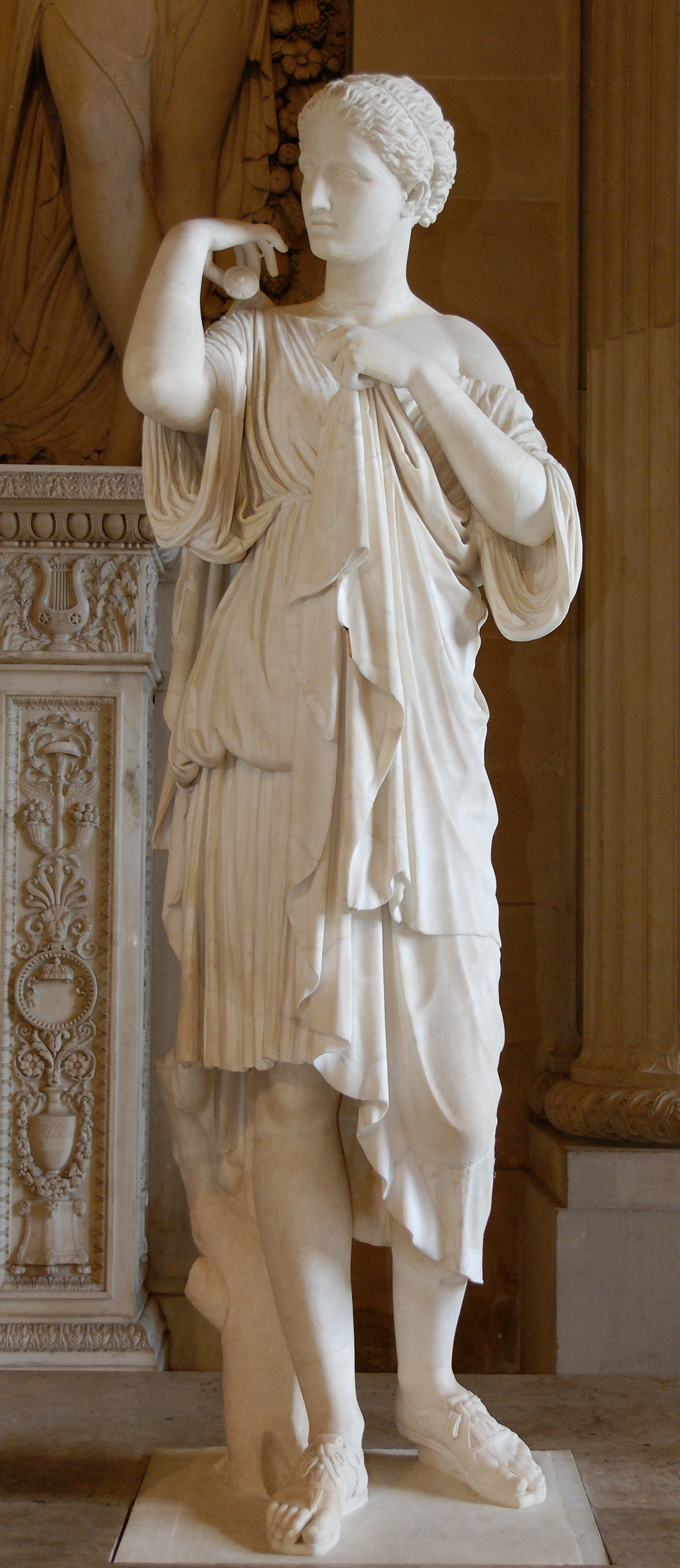
Artemis (Louvre)

== Cultural influences ==
Gabii's importance in the earliest history of Rome is also apparent elsewhere: the adoption of the cinctus Gabinus (a method of draping the toga that leaves both arms free) by the Romans for certain ceremonies, the unique role it played for the augurs as seen from the specific term ager Gabinus used by these priests (Varro, Ling. 5,33), and its presence in a Roman formula of devotio.

== Archaeology ==
From 2007 the multi-institution Gabii Project, led by Nicola Terrenato of the University of Michigan conducted a large-scale geophysical survey over most of the area inside the city walls which revealed a unform, almost orthogonal, grid of streets centred on a main road, the urban extension of the ancient road originally known as Via Gabina from the direction of Rome. The perpendicular roads branched off, but were adapted to the slope of the cone of the crater. This grid layout is an anomaly, compared with the irregular urban plans of most Latin cities in this period, and shows that early Gabii was planned and coordinated as a whole by a central political authority, and based on Greek models. Excavations from 2010 showed the earliest roads of the late 5th century BC were cut into the bedrock, while later surfaces from the mid-Republican period (3rd century BC) to Late Antiquity (5th century AD) used successive layers of packed gravel and clay (viae glareatae). In some cases lava slabs were used, thus demonstrating how the road infrastructure was continuously maintained.

=== Sanctuary of Juno Gabina ===
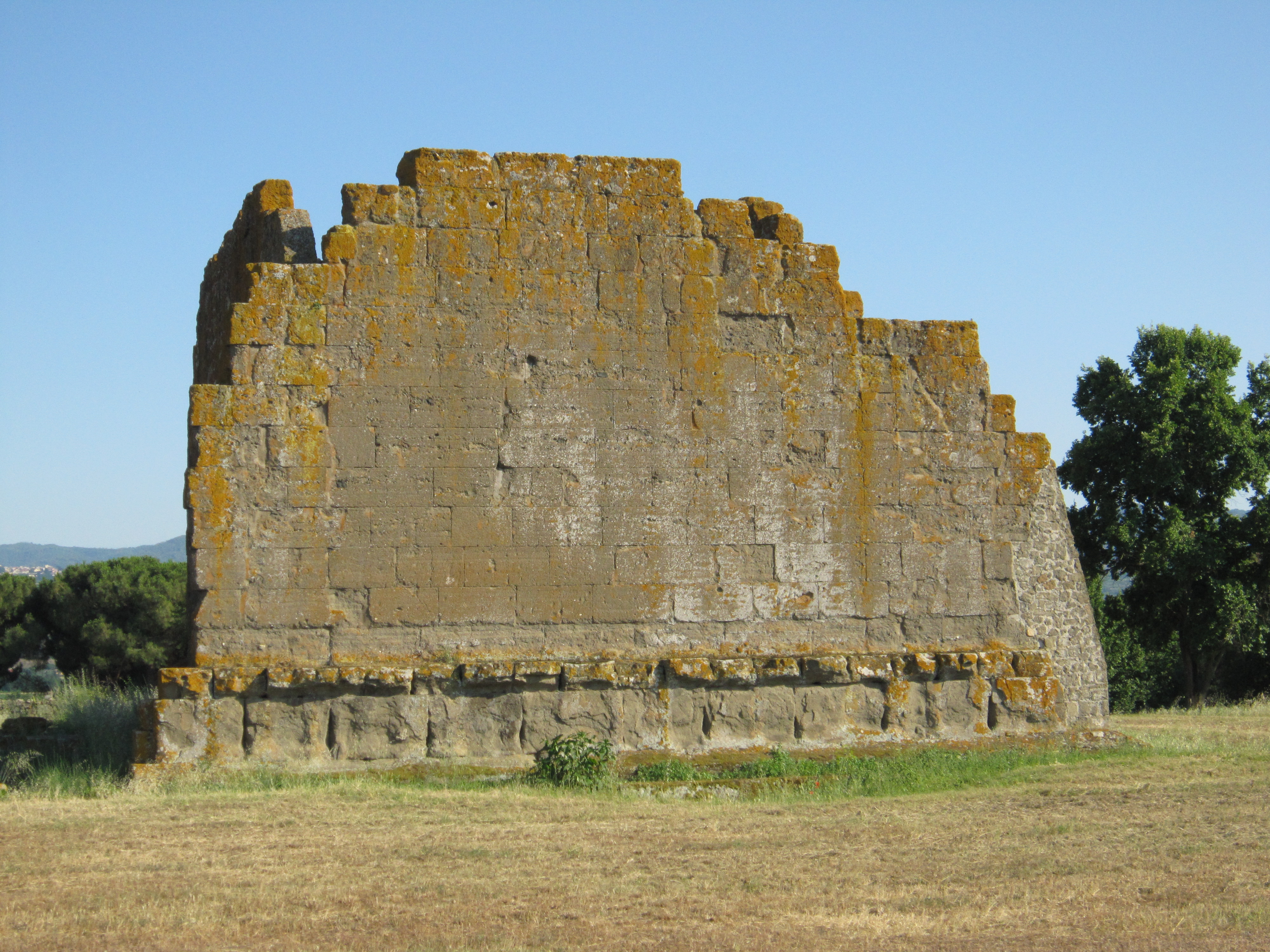
Temple of Juno, back

The most conspicuous remains at the site are of a temple, generally attributed to Juno, which had six Ionic or Corinthian columns in the front and six on each side, excluding the back. It was at the centre of a sanctuary which included a theatre and other buildings, typical of other sanctuaries in Latium such as at nearby Praeneste and Tibur. Like other sanctuaries it was built on a hillside to give greater visual impact. The temple was composed of a single room (cella), using lapis Gabinus from the quarries around Gabii (the same stone made its way into some of the buildings of Rome itself). The temple was situated on a podium at the centre of a precinct surrounded by of Doric colonnades on 3 sides which fronted rooms, perhaps multi-functional, for such uses as temple shops. The temple was excavated by the Spanish School at Rome in the 1960s and 1970s.

The temple was constructed 150-100 BC. A painted inscription (IVN) on an antefix identifies it as a temple of Juno. Around the rear of the temple (on the cliff side), which faced and towered above the road, were about 55 pits for trees representing a sacred grove. The site began as sacred grove in the 7th century BC in which one tree was especially worshipped. In the 4th century BC a small shrine was constructed next to the grove around which caches of anatomical terra cotta statuettes were found. This type of statuette modeled an organ or section of the human body and was given as a votive offering at a healing sanctuary, of which a great many have been found in Latium, in hope that divinity would turn its attention to healing the organ of the dedicator. Also found were some votive pedestals inscribed to Fortuna. A pavement was inscribed to Jupiter Jurarius ("of oaths"), indicating possible state functions of the site. There were two other shrines at the location.

The temple to Juno remained in use during the empire after the town was abandoned.

=== Forum ===
To the east of the temple lay the supposed area of the forum, where excavations were made by Gavin Hamilton in 1792. Hamilton discovered a large cache of statues that were initially placed in the Borghese collection, although many of them subsequently were carried off to Paris by Napoleon, and still remain in the Louvre. The statues and busts are especially numerous and interesting (38 in all); besides the deities Venus, Diana, Nemesis, etc., they comprise Agrippa, Tiberius, Germanicus, Caligula, Claudius, Nero, Trajan and Plotina, Hadrian and Sabina, Marcus Aurelius, Septimius Severus, Geta, Gordian III and others. The inscriptions relate mainly to local and municipal matters.

=== Baths ===
From 2013 a large public thermal complex was discovered covering 250 m^{2} along the road that crosses Gabii and dating from the Augustan age to the first decades of the first century AD. It was frequented at least until the fourth century AD and supports Gabii's ancient fame for its thermal baths. The entrance and the frigidarium, tepidarium and calidarium are decorated with remarkable and varied mosaic decorations, ranging from simple geometric patterns to more complex ones. They include in particular a marine subject with male figures riding fantastic marine animals made with Giallo antico, white and black tesserae in a heated room; another in the caldarium depicts four chariots flanked by horses, arranged around a central male figure indicated as VICTOR CVSTOR THERMARU in black and white tesserae.

=== Tower of Castiglione ===
The citadel of Gabii is now marked by the ruins of the medieval tower of Castiglione.

=== Fieldwork since the 1990s ===
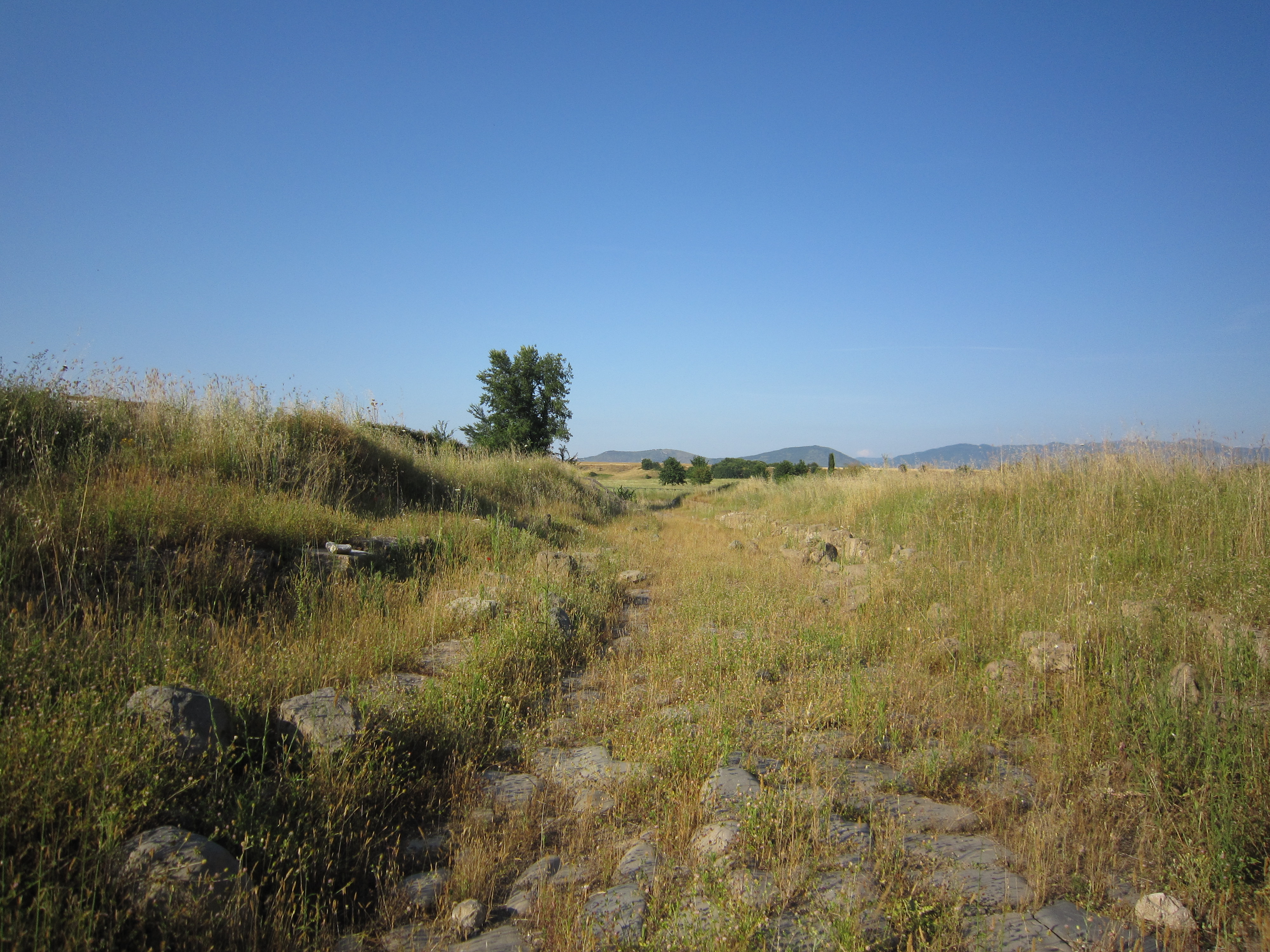
Via Gabina, later Prenestina

New fieldwork has been undertaken to the east of Gabii along the lines of the ancient city wall where a sanctuary has been excavated by Marco Fabbri close to one of the city's gates. Other work at the site has been carried out by Stefano Musco, the local inspector of the Soprintendenza Speciale per i Beni Archeologici di Roma (SSBAR). These excavators, led by Marco Fabbri, reported the discovery of an Archaic building that they identified as a 'regia' in March 2010.

==== Gabii Project ====
In 2010, the Gabii Project reported the discovery of a half-ton lead encased inhumation burial that has tentatively been dated to the Roman Imperial period, likely the second or third centuries AD. Evidence for early elite burials, in this case those of infants suggesting the development of social hierarchy in the eighth through sixth centuries AD. The discovery of an important but fragmentary Republican Latin inscription was published in 2011.

In October 2025, researchers from the University of Missouri unearthed a large stone-lined basin. Carved directly into bedrock, the basin likely served as a monumental fountain at the crossroads of a public intersection. This was a remarkable find, as it is a very early example of Roman monumental architecture other than temples and city walls. Archaeologists date the structure to around 250 BC.

== See also ==
- Praxiteles
- Roman art
- Tall poppy syndrome
- Sextus Tarquinius

== Sources ==
- Cornell, Timothy J (1995). "The Origin of Rome: Archaeology in Rome and Old Latium: the Nature of the Evidence". The Beginnings of Rome: Italy and Rome from the Bronze Age to the Punic Wars (c. 1000-264 BC). The Routledge History of the Ancient World. Routledge. pp. 48–80. ISBN 978-0-415-01596-7.
- Gell, William; Bunbury, Edward Herbert (1846). "Gabii". The topography of Rome and its Vicinity (New, Revised and Enlarged ed.). London: Henry G. Bohn. pp. 260–269.
- Holloway, R. Ross (1996). "8: Osteria del'Osa". The archaeology of early Rome and Latium. Routledge. pp. 103–113. ISBN 978-0-415-14360-8.
- Richardson, L. Jr (2009) [1976]. "GABII (Castiglione) Italy". In Stillwell, Richard (ed.). Princeton Encyclopedia of Classical Sites. Princeton, Medford: Princeton University Press, Tufts University.
- Smith, Christopher John (1996). "Latial Period II: Osteria dell'Osa". Early Rome and Latium: economy and society c. 1000 to 500 BC. Oxford, New York: Oxford University Press. pp. 57–71.
- Jeffrey A. Becker, Marcello Mogetta, and Nicola Terrenato. "A new plan for an ancient Italian city: Gabii revealed." American Journal of Archaeology 113.4 (October 2009):629-42.
- Nicola Terrenato, A. Gallone, Jeffrey A. Becker, and S. Kay. 2010. "Urbanistica Ortogonale a Gabii: Risultati delle nuove prospezioni geofisiche e prospettive per il futuro." In Lazio e Sabina VI: Atti del Convegno. Sesto Incontro di Studi sul Lazio e la Sabina. Roma 4-6 marzo 2009 , edited by G. Ghini, 237-48. Rome: Edizioni Quasar.
- Jeffrey A. Becker and J. Nowlin. 2011. "Orientalizing Infant Burials from Gabii, Italy." BABESCH 86:27-39.
- Benjamin Fortson and avid Potter. 2011. "A Fragmentary Early Republican Public Inscription from Gabii." Zeitschrift für Papyrologie und Epigraphik 178:255-60.
- Sophie Hellas. 2014. "Gabii/Latium. Die Befestigungen von archaischer bis in mittelrepublikanische Zeit." Kölner und Bonner Archaeologica 3/2013:145-166.
- M. Mogetta and J. A. Becker, 2014. "Archaeological Research at Gabii, Italy: The Gabii Project Excavations 2009-2011." American Journal of Archaeology 118(1): 171-88.
- M. Mogetta, 2014. "From Latin Planned Urbanism to Roman Colonial Layouts: the Town-planning of Gabii and its Cultural Implications." In E. Robinson (ed.), Papers on Italian Urbanism in the First Millennium B.C. (Journal of Roman Archaeology, Suppl. 97): 145-74. Portsmouth, R.I.: Journal of Roman Archaeology.
