= Seascale =

Village in Cumbria, England

Coordinates: 54.395°N 3.483333°W

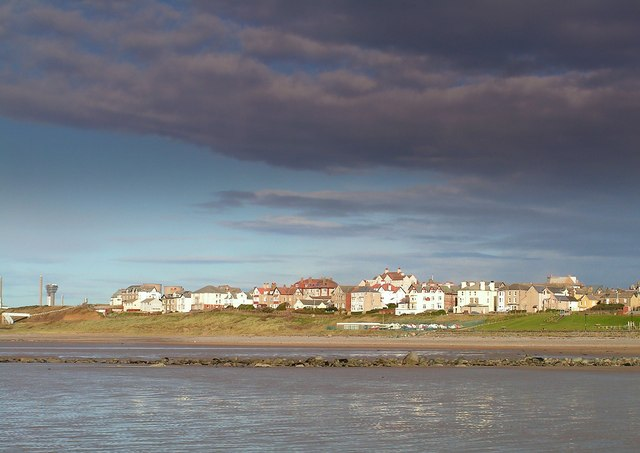
- Seascale

- Location in Copeland Borough Location within Cumbria
- Population: 1,709 (2021)
- OS grid reference: NY0370300976
- Civil parish: Seascale
- Unitary authority: Cumberland
- Ceremonial county: Cumbria
- Region: North West
- Country: England
- Sovereign state: United Kingdom
- Post town: SEASCALE
- Postcode district: CA20
- Dialling code: 019467
- Police: Cumbria
- Fire: Cumbria
- Ambulance: North West
- UK Parliament: Whitehaven and Workington

Seascale is a village and civil parish on the Irish Sea coast of Cumbria, England, historically within Cumberland. The parish had a population of 1,754 in 2011, barely decreasing by 0.4% in 2021.

== History ==
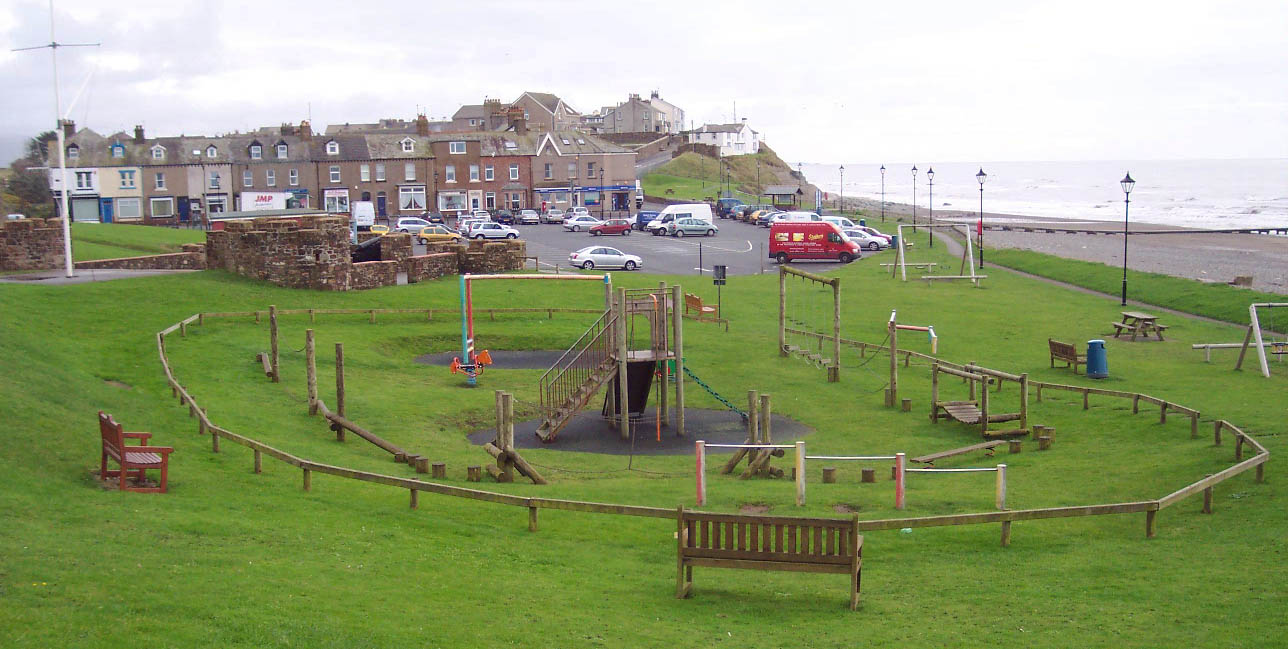
The sea front at Seascale

The place-name indicates that it was inhabited by Norse settlers, probably before 1000 AD. It is derived from skali, meaning in Norse a wooden hut or shelter. This could well date from the time of King Harold Fairhair, who vowed revenge on the many Norsemen who had settled in Ireland and the Isle of Man, causing them to flee across the sea to the Cumbrian coast some time after AD 885. Many other Norse place names are to be found, including Seascale How, Skala Haugr, (the hill near the shelter), and Whitriggs, hvitihrgger (the white ridge). As the Norse penetrated inland other skalar were named, so Seascale was distinguished by reference to the sea.

The earliest written reference to Seascale is in the period 1154–1181, when an Aldwin de Seascale was witness to a deed made at Wetheral priory. Another early reference is in 1200 in a charter of Roger de Beauchamp to the priory of St. Bees. It states that land he gave to that monastery was near Leseschalis or Seascale, on the western coast. About this time Alan de Coupland and William de Wabyrththwaite granted land to Walter de Sewnyhous in the nearby manor of Bolton, which remained in that family's possession for over 500 years. The present community of Hallsenna is derived from this name, being called Hall Sevenhouse, and later, Hall Senhouse. Seascale was part of the ancient parish of Gosforth, which was divided into the manors of Gosforth, Boonwood, Bolton High, Bolton Low and Seascale, who jointly elected a churchwarden for Gosforth church.

The community of Seascale continued as a series of farms until the coming of the Furness Railway in 1850. This ran from Whitehaven to Barrow in Furness. Some small development took place in the wake of this, but it was recorded that in 1869 "there was not a shop in the place". Further development had to wait until 1879 when Sir James Ramsden of the Furness Railway promoted an ambitious plan to develop Seascale as a holiday resort. Edward Kemp of Birkenhead produced the designs, which included a large hotel, marine walks and villas, which would have stretched along 1.5 mi (2 km) of the coastline, however only a small number of buildings were constructed. The Scawfell Hotel, dating from that time and adjacent to the railway station, was demolished in 1997. The hotel's Victorian advertising made much of the fine beach and boasted its own bathing machines. Seascale was also promoted as an ideal centre for touring the western valleys of the Lake District.

In 1881 the "Iron Church" of St Cuthbert was built, but was blown down in 1884. Although rebuilt, it was too small for the growing community, and in 1890 a stone church was built to the design of C F Ferguson. In 1886 the Methodist Church, also dedicated to St. Cuthbert, was built nearby.

Little further development occurred until the establishment of the Royal Ordnance Factories at Sellafield and Drigg in 1939, both just a few miles away, when accommodation was built for munitions workers. In 1947 after World War II, the huge nuclear building programme at the former Sellafield ordnance factory commenced and Seascale became a dormitory community for the resultant Windscale and Calder Hall nuclear sites (later combined as Sellafield). As a result, in the 1950s it was known as "the brainiest town in Britain".

== Location ==
It is located just outside the Lake District National Park. The large multi-function nuclear site Sellafield is 3 mi (5 km) away.

Travelling by road, Seascale is 21.1 miles (34.0 km) to the north of Millom, 35.5 miles (57.1 km) to the north of Barrow in Furness, and 14.7 miles (23.7 km) to the south of Whitehaven.

The village is close to the A595 and is served by Seascale railway station on the Cumbrian Coast Line.

== Governance ==
Seascale is within the constituency of Whitehaven and Workington, and is represented in Parliament by Josh MacAlister.

The village also has its own Parish Council; Seascale Parish Council, this electoral ward stretches to Scafell Pike and has a total population of 2,823 as taken at the 2011 Census.

== Literary associations ==
The noted Victorian author George Gissing based part of one of his novels, The Odd Women, on Seascale and the Lake District. Gissing first visited in 1868/69 as a youngster, and although he only visited Seascale and the Lakes about four times, it left a tremendous impression on him, and he used material from his visits over the course of 30 years of writing.

Hugh Walpole lived in Gosforth nearby as a child and so knew Seascale well. The locale inspired a story of smugglers which he started at that time. This was later an inspiration for his best-selling novel, Rogue Herries, which was published in 1930, starting a series about the Herries family.

== Shootings ==
On 2 June 2010, the area became the centre of a search after a gunman ran amok in Cumbria. The gunman was identified as 52-year-old Whitehaven taxi driver Derrick Bird and is known to have killed twelve people and injured eleven others before taking his own life in Boot. Two of the victims were shot dead in Seascale; two others in the surroundings of the neighbouring village of Gosforth, along with another victim who was seriously wounded.

== See also ==
- Listed buildings in Seascale
