= Etymonline =

Online etymological dictionary

Online Etymology Dictionary (Etymonline)
- Website type: Etymological dictionary
- Available in: English
- Owner: Harper Family LLC
- Creator: Douglas R. Harper
- Website: www.etymonline.com
- Registration: Optional
- Current status: Active
- Content license: Proprietary
- OCLC number: 51773921

The Online Etymology Dictionary, also known by its domain name Etymonline, is an American online dictionary of the origins and historical development of English words, compiled and written primarily by Douglas R. Harper. Harper founded the project in 2001. Since 2021, Talia Felix has served as associate editor.

== History and description ==
Logo in 2007

Harper has described the project as an attempt to provide a comprehensive, freely available etymological reference online, characterizing his work primarily as compiling and evaluating earlier etymological scholarship. The dictionary distinguishes etymology from definition and notes that the two should not be treated as interchangeable.

=== Sources and methodology ===
Etymonline's etymologies are based on established print dictionaries and related scholarship. Harper lists the Oxford English Dictionary, the Barnhart Dictionary of Etymology, works by Ernest Klein and Ernest Weekley, and Proto–Indo-European references such as Calvert Watkins among the site's core sources.

The site maintains a published bibliography of principal reference works consulted in the compilation of database, but does not attribute individual citations. Etymonline has also been characterized in computational linguistics literature as a compilation drawing on numerous published sources.

=== Platform and services ===
In addition to the main dictionary, Etymonline publishes editorial columns and maintains an official discussion forum. The website offers a paid subscription service, Etymonline Premium. It also distributes official apps and browser tools, including iOS and Android apps and a Chrome extension.

According to its terms of service, the site asserts proprietary rights in its content and restricts unauthorized reuse of its material.

== Reception ==
The Online Etymology Dictionary has been listed and described in library and reference catalogs, including the University of Pennsylvania Libraries' Online Books Page and McMaster University Libraries' database directory. It has also been recommended as a public reference resource by libraries such as Forbes Library. In a 2023 software review in Technology in Language Teaching & Learning, Ibrahim Halil Topal evaluated the site as an online dictionary resource and discussed both potential advantages and limitations for learners and educators. A 2017 master's thesis used Etymonline as a case study in proposing ways to reorganize an etymological database to support enhanced searching and browsing.
