= Scenes from Provincial Life =

Scenes from Provincial Life may refer to:

- Boyhood: Scenes from Provincial Life, 1997 fictionalised autobiographical work by J. M. Coetzee
- Scenes from Provincial Life (series), books by Hugh Walpole
- Scenes from Provincial Life, a pair of 19th-century novels in La Comédie humaine by Honoré de Balzac
- Scenes from Provincial Life, a 1950 novel by William Cooper
- Scenes from Provincial Life, a 1991 book by Joan Givner
