= John Mark Ockerbloom =

Digital library architect and planner

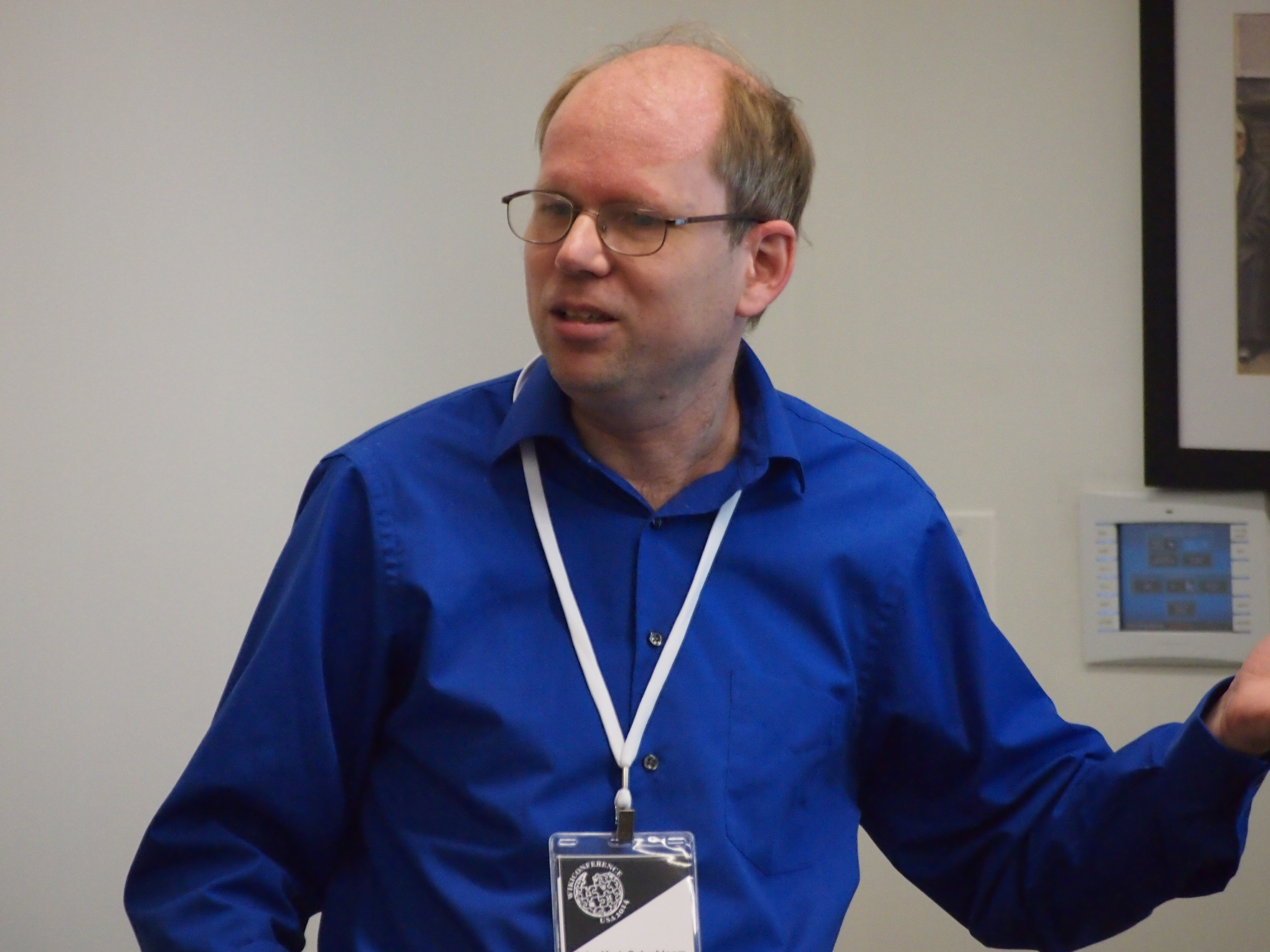
- Ockerbloom in 2014
- Born: John Ockerbloom; 1966 (age 59–60)
- Education: PhD
- Occupation: Software engineer
- Employer: University of Pennsylvania
- Known for: Online Books Page
- Notable work: (see bibliography)
- Title: Digital library architect

John Mark Ockerbloom (born 1966) is a digital library architect and planner in the library science field. Formerly at Carnegie Mellon University, from which he earned a PhD in computer science, he now works for the University of Pennsylvania. He is the editor of The Online Books Page, which lists over two million books including Project Gutenberg titles, all of which are freely available for reading online or by download.

== Education ==
Mark Ockerbloom attended Carnegie Mellon University in the 1990s and earned a PhD in computer science.

== Career ==
Mark Ockerbloom works as a digital library planner and researcher at the University of Pennsylvania.

He is involved in the use of technology by the general public for the public good. He is the chair of the ILS-DI Task Group for the Digital Library Federation.

=== Free speech ===
In 1994, Mark Ockerbloom created Banned Books On-Line in response to the censoring of usenet newsgroups on Carnegie Mellon's servers. A number of organizations including Electronic Frontier Foundation and the American Civil Liberties Union were opposing the Communications Decency Act around that time and took note of Banned Books On-Line, linking to it from their websites.

In 1998, Mark Ockerbloom joined as a plaintiff along with columnist Rob Morse of the San Francisco Examiner, the ACLU and others in a federal lawsuit against a library using web filtering software. The Loudoun County Library in Virginia installed X-Stop filtering software created by Log-On Data Corporation. The filtering software stopped library patrons from visiting the websites of the San Francisco Examiner, The San Francisco Chronicle and Ockerbloom's Banned Books On-Line.

=== Copyright ===
Mark Ockerbloom has pointed out some of the conflicts between web 2.0 and copyright law, describing how multimedia can contain unintended copyright violations. Mark Ockerbloom runs the Online Books Page, which indexes books that are free to read over the Internet. In 1993, while at Carnegie Mellon University, Ockerbloom started the Online Books Page which allows readers to find books by title, subject or author. The site has been described as one of the largest and most popular resources for online books. He has said the Copyright Term Extension Act can have a chilling effect on websites that provide readers easy access to books online and is concerned about the conflict between the public good and the interests of for-profit enterprises.

== Personal life ==
Mark Ockerbloom's wife, Mary Mark Ockerbloom, is the editor of A Celebration of Women Writers website, which lists resources about women writers and works written by women that are freely viewable online.

== Bibliography ==
- Mark Ockerbloom, John (2008). Mapping the Library Future: Subject Navigation for Today's and Tomorrow's Library Catalogs. Scholarly Commons. OCLC 727908567.
- Mark Ockerbloom, John (2006). The Next Mother Lode for Large-scale Digitization? Historic Serials, Copyrights, and Shared Knowledge. Scholarly Commons. OCLC 727908567.
- Mark Ockerbloom, John (1998). Mediating Among Diverse Data Formats. Pittsburgh: Carnegie Mellon University. OCLC 39527519.
- Mark Ockerbloom, John (August 1995). Exploiting Structured Data in Wide-Area Information Systems. Pittsburgh: Carnegie Mellon University. OCLC 33879705.
