= Distributed Proofreaders =

Web-based proofreading project

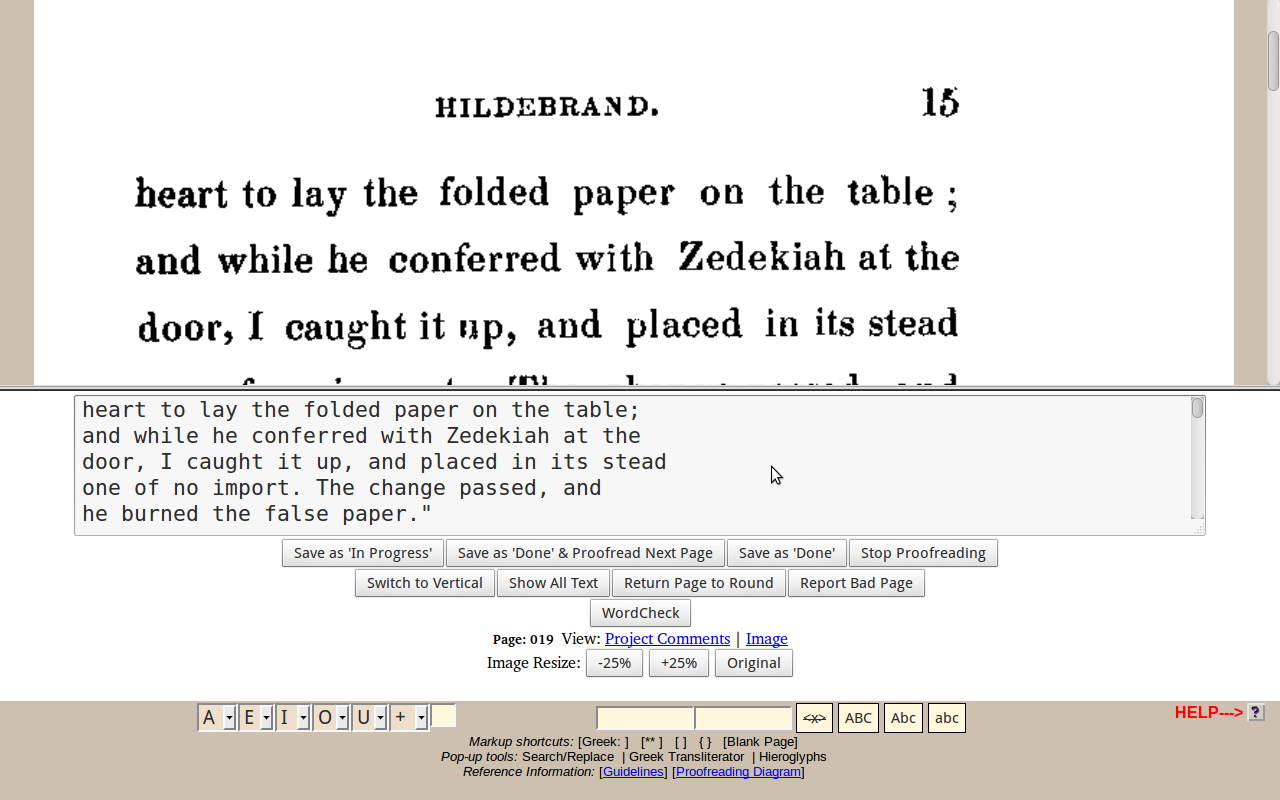
- Screenshot of the proofreading interface on Distributed Proofreaders
- Website type: Not-for-profit
- Available in: 3 languages
- List of languages English, French, German
- Country of origin: United States
- Owner: Distributed Proofreaders Foundation (DPF)
- Founder: Charles Franks
- General manager: Linda Hamilton
- Website: pgdp.net
- Commercial: No
- Registration: Optional
- Launched: 2000; 26 years ago
- Current status: Active
- Content license: Public domain
- Written in: PHP
- OCLC number: 1087497129

Distributed Proofreaders (commonly abbreviated as DP or PGDP) is a web-based project that supports the development of e-texts for Project Gutenberg by allowing many people to work together in proofreading drafts of e-texts for errors. As of December 2025, the site had digitized 50,000 titles.

== History ==
Distributed Proofreaders was founded by Charles Franks in 2000 as an independent site to assist Project Gutenberg. Distributed Proofreaders became an official Project Gutenberg site in 2002.

On 8 November 2002, Distributed Proofreaders was slashdotted, and more than 4,000 new members joined in one day, causing an influx of new proofreaders and software developers, which helped to increase the quantity and quality of e-text production.

In 2006, the Distributed Proofreaders Foundation was formed to provide Distributed Proofreaders with its own legal entity and not-for-profit status, separate from Project Gutenberg. The founding trustees were Charles Franks, Juliet Sutherland, and Gregory B. Newby.

In July 2015, the 30,000th Distributed Proofreaders produced e-text was posted to Project Gutenberg. DP-contributed e-texts comprised more than half of works in Project Gutenberg by 2009.

== Proofreading process ==
DP servers are located in the United States, and therefore works must be cleared by Project Gutenberg as being in the public domain according to United States copyright law before they can be proofread and eventually published.

Public domain works, typically books with expired copyright, are scanned by volunteers or sourced from digitization projects, and the images are run through optical character recognition (OCR) software. Since OCR software is far from perfect, the resulting text always includes errors. To correct them, pages are made available to volunteers via the Internet; the original page image and the recognized text appear side by side. Each set is presented to multiple volunteers to enter corrections, which results in a combined dataset that minimizes errors. This process distributes the time-consuming error-correction process with a method akin to distributed computing.

A post-processor combines the pages and prepares the text for uploading to Project Gutenberg.

Besides custom software created to support the project, DP also runs a forum and a wiki for project coordinators and participants.

== Related projects ==
=== DP Europe ===
In January 2004, Distributed Proofreaders Europe started, hosted by Project Rastko, Serbia. This site had the ability to process text in Unicode UTF-8 encoding. Books proofread centered on European culture, with a considerable proportion of non-English texts including Hebrew, Arabic, Urdu, and many others. As of October 2013, DP Europe had produced 787 e-texts, the last of these in November 2011.

=== DP Canada ===
In December 2007, Distributed Proofreaders Canada launched to support the production of e-books for Project Gutenberg Canada and take advantage of shorter Canadian copyright terms. Although it was established by members of the original Distributed Proofreaders site, it is a separate entity. All its projects are posted to Faded Page, their book archive website. In addition, it supplies books to Project Gutenberg Canada, and, where copyright laws are compatible, to the original Project Gutenberg.

== Milestones ==
The source for many of these entries is the DP Timeline.

Milestone	Date	E-text
First	1 Oct 2000	The Odyssey, Homer, Lang tr. (first pages for proofreading)
1,000th	19 Feb 2003	Tales of St. Austin's, P. G. Wodehouse
2,000th	3 Sep 2003	Hamlet — the 'Bad Quarto', William Shakespeare
3,000th	14 Jan 2004	The Anatomy of Melancholy, Robert Burton
4,000th	6 Apr 2004	Aventures du Capitaine Hatteras, Jules Verne
5,000th	24 Aug 2004	A Short Biographical Dictionary of English Literature, John William Cousin
10,000th	9 Mar 2007	(See 10,000th e-book below.)
15,000th	12 May 2009	Philosophical Transactions of the Royal Society - Vol 1 - 1666, various, Henry Oldenburg (editor)
20,000th	10 April 2011	(See 20,000th e-book below.)
25,000th	10 April 2013	The Art and Practice of Silver Printing, H. P. Robinson and Capt. Abney
30,000th	7 July 2015	Graded Literature Readers: Fourth Book
35,000th	26 Jan 2018	Shores of the Polar Sea, a Narrative of the Arctic Expedition of 1875–1876
40,000th	10 October 2020	All four volumes of London Labour and the London Poor
45,000th	18 January 2023	Down the Mackenzie and Up the Yukon in 1906, Elihu Stewart
50,000th	7 December 2025	A Dictionary of the Art of Printing

=== 10,000th e-book ===
On 9 March 2007, Distributed Proofreaders announced the completion of more than 10,000 titles. In celebration, a collection of fifteen titles was published:

- Slave Narratives, Oklahoma (A Folk History of Slavery in the United States From Interviews with Former Slaves), U.S. Work Projects Administration (English)
- Eighth annual report of the Bureau of ethnology (1891 N 08 / 1886–1887), edited by John Wesley Powell (English)
- R. Caldecott's First Collection of Pictures and Songs, Randolph Caldecott [illustrator] (English)
- Como atravessei Àfrica (Volume II), Serpa Pinto (Portuguese)
- Triplanetary, E. E. "Doc" Smith (English)
- Heidi, Johanna Spyri (English)
- Heimatlos, Johanna Spyri (German)
- October 27, 1920 issue of Punch (English)
- Sylva, or, A Discourse of Forest-Trees, John Evelyn (English)
- Encyclopedia of Needlework, Therese de Dillmont (English)
- The annals of the Cakchiquels, Francisco Ernantez Arana (fl. 1582), translated and edited by Daniel G. Brinton (1837–1899) (English with Central American Indian)
- The Shanty Book, Part I, Sailor Shanties (1921), Richard Runciman Terry (1864–1938) (English)
- Le marchand de Venise, William Shakespeare, translated by François Guizot (French)
- Agriculture for beginners, Rev. ed., Charles William Burkett (English)
- Species Plantarum (Part 1), Carl Linnaeus (Carl von Linné) (Latin)

=== 20,000th e-book ===
On April 10, 2011, the 20,000th book milestone was celebrated as a group release of bilingual books:

- The Renaissance in Italy–Italian Literature, Vol 1, John Addington Symonds (English with Italian)
- Märchen und Erzählungen für Anfänger; erster Teil, H. A. Guerber (German with English)
- Gedichte und Sprüche, Walther von der Vogelweide (Middle High German (c. 1050–1500) with German)
- Studien und Plaudereien im Vaterland, Sigmon Martin Stern (German with English)
- Caos del Triperuno, Teofilo Folengo (Italian with Latin)
- Niederländische Volkslieder, Hoffmann von Fallersleben (German with Dutch)
- A "San Francisco", Salvatore Di Giacomo (Italian with Neapolitan)
- O' voto, Salvatore Di Giacomo (Italian with Neapolitan)
- De Latino sine Flexione & Principio de Permanentia, Giuseppe Peano (1858–1932) (Latin with Latino sine Flexione)
- Cappiddazzu paga tuttu—Nino Martoglio, Luigi Pirandello (Italian with Sicilian)
- The International Auxiliary Language Esperanto, George Cox (English with Esperanto)
- Lusitania: canti popolari portoghesi, Ettore Toci (Italian with French)

=== 30,000th e-book ===
On 7 July 2015, the 30,000th book milestone was celebrated with a group of thirty texts. One was numbered 30,000:

- Graded literature readers - Fourth book, editors: Harry Pratt Judson and Ida C. Bender, 1900

=== 40,000th e-book ===
On 10 October 2020, the 40,000th book milestone was celebrated with the completion of a four-volume work, London Labour and the London Poor, by Henry Mayhew.

=== 50,000th e-book ===
On 7 December 2025, the 50,000th book milestone was celebrated with the posting of A Dictionary of the Art of Printing by William Savage.

== See also ==
- List of digital library projects
- Wikisource
- reCAPTCHA
