= Gregory B. Newby =

American and Canadian technologist (1965–2025)

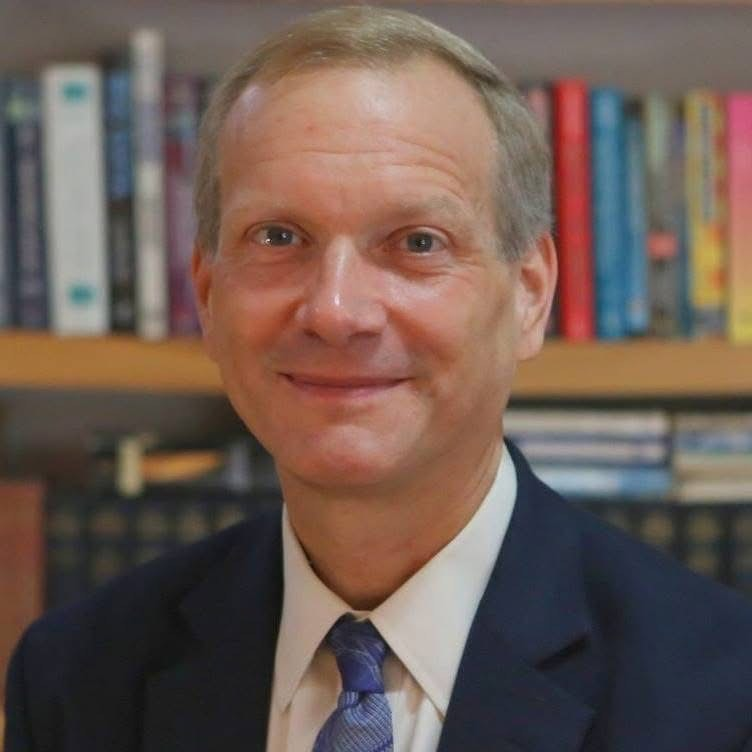
- Newby in 2018
- Born: Gregory Barton Newby; February 9, 1965; Montreal, Quebec, Canada
- Died: October 21, 2025 (aged 60); Whitehorse, Yukon, Canada
- Known for: Project Gutenberg
- Website: petascale.org

Gregory B. Newby (February 9, 1965 – October 21, 2025) was an American and Canadian information scientist who worked on supercomputing projects and increasing access to information using the Internet. He was the volunteer CEO of the Project Gutenberg Literary Archive Foundation, the organization supporting the Project Gutenberg library of digitized ebooks, and was a longtime volunteer for the conference Hackers on Planet Earth (HOPE). In the 1990s and 2000s, he taught in the library and information science departments at the University of Illinois at Urbana-Champaign and the University of North Carolina at Chapel Hill.

== Early life and education ==
Newby was born in Montreal in February 1965. He received a BA in Communication and Psychology and MA in Communication from the State University of New York at Albany. He completed a PhD at Syracuse University in information transfer. While studying, he was interested in BITNET and the early Internet. He also had an MBA in Sustainable Systems from the Bainbridge Graduate Institute of Pinchot University.

== Career ==
Newby was a faculty member at the University of Illinois at Urbana-Champaign in the Graduate School of Library and Information Science from 1991 to 1997. During his work there, he co-founded Prairienet, an early community internet network, in 1993. Prairienet was a free-net that provided Illinois residents free access to online services including email, the World Wide Web, Gopher, and FTP. It was part of community informatics work at the university, a goal of empowering communities through access to computer resources and networked information. Starting in 2001, Newby served as Standards Editor for the Open Grid Forum (formerly the Global Grid Forum).

Newby wrote an early guide to navigating the Internet, including information about web directories, titled Directory of Directories on the Internet: A Guide to Information Sources (Meckler, 1994). A reviewer, James R. Rettig, said the book was helpful for overcoming the "vast dark stretches between the wondrous bright information sources one can find out there in cyberspace". Newby also co-edited a book of essays about publishing academic work online in 1996, Scholarly Publishing: The Electronic Frontier.

Newby was an assistant professor at UNC School of Information and Library Science from 1997 to 2003. While at UNC, he included an unofficial DVD player for Linux, DeCSS, in one of his syllabuses, and he received pressure from the Motion Picture Association and the university to take it down.

In 2003, Newby became a staff member at the Arctic Region Supercomputing Center at the University of Alaska Fairbanks. He became the director of the center in 2005. He oversaw supercomputing work including weather forecasting for Alaska. He managed King Abdullah University of Science and Technology's Supercomputing Laboratory in Saudi Arabia. He joined Compute Canada (now the Digital Research Alliance of Canada) as its chief technology officer in 2014. In 2020, he started working in IT for the government of Yukon, Canada. Newby's work was cited by the Yukon Government's Deputy Minister Award for Group Service Excellence and the Yukon Government's Premier's Award of Excellence and Innovation.

He coauthored papers on information retrieval, high-performance computing, computer-supported cooperative work, and other topics.

== Volunteer roles ==
Newby got involved with Project Gutenberg in 1991 or 1992, became friends with founder Michael S. Hart, and was "undoubtedly the most consequential volunteer", according to a scholar writing about the history of the project. In 2000 or 2001, Newby formed the associated nonprofit organization, the Project Gutenberg Literary Archive Foundation, and became its director and CEO. He also worked to integrate Distributed Proofreaders into the project. He was a founding trustee of the Distributed Proofreaders Foundation at its formation in July 2006. He led improvements to the technology platform underlying Project Gutenberg and navigated challenges related to the copyright status of books in different countries. He published an ebook about the project, Forty-Five Years of Digitizing Ebooks: Project Gutenberg's Practices, in 2019. In 2023, the Project Gutenberg Open Audiobook Collection was named as one of "The Best Inventions of 2023" by TIME magazine, after the organization collaborated with Microsoft and the Massachusetts Institute of Technology to employ text-to-speech technology to transform 5,000 books into artificial intelligence-narrated audiobooks.

Newby served as a co-organizer for the conference Hackers on Planet Earth (HOPE) for many years. He presented about hacker ethics in 2000 and "hacker" as a positive term in 2002. At HOPE XV in 2024, he spoke about opportunities to mitigate climate change.

== Personal life and death ==
Newby lived in Whitehorse, Canada. He completed several ultramarathons. He also participated in dog sled races and ran a recreational sled dog kennel with his wife Ilana Kingsley.

On October 21, 2025, Project Gutenberg and 2600 Magazine (which sponsors the HOPE conference) announced that Newby had died from pancreatic cancer. He was 60.
