= Standard Ebooks =

Online digital book library

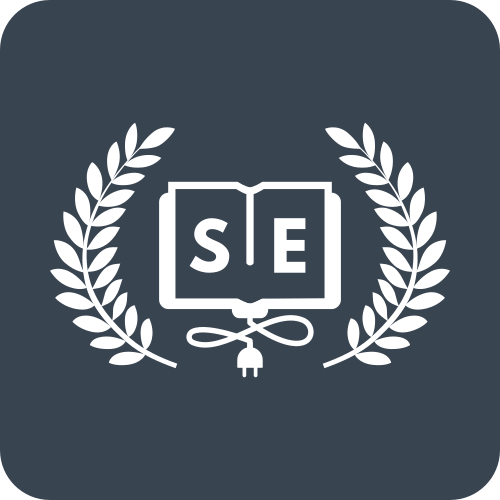
- Logo
- Location: United States
- Established: 2015; 11 years ago

Collection
- Size: 1,502 books (19 August 2026)

Other information
- Website: standardebooks.org

Standard Ebooks is an open source, volunteer-driven project to create and publish high-quality, fully featured, and accessible ebooks of works in the public domain. The project sources existing ebooks from sites like Project Gutenberg and the Internet Archive, modernizing and proofreading them to adhere to a unified style guide.

All Standard Ebooks titles are released in epub, azw3, and Kepub formats, and are available through Google Play Books and Apple Books. All of the project's ebook files are released in the United States public domain, and all code is released under the GNU General Public License v3.

== History ==
Standard Ebooks was founded by Alex Cabal after he experienced frustration at being unable to find well-formatted English-language ebooks while living in Germany. After early experiments creating a pay what you want edition of Alice's Adventures in Wonderland, the Standard Ebooks website was launched in 2015. Initial notice came from posts on Hacker News and Reddit, with later mentions including Stack Overflow's newsletter.

In 2021, Standard Ebooks began accepting donations and sponsorships to produce specific books. In May 2024, Standard Ebooks published Ulysses as its thousandth title.

== Style ==
Standard Ebooks produces ebooks by following a unified style guide, which specifies everything from typography standards to semantic tagging and internal code structure, with the goal of creating a consistent corpus, aligned with modern publishing standards and "cleaned of ancient and irrelevant ephemera". Standard Ebooks works with organizations such as the National Network for Equitable Library Service, and strives to conform to DAISY Consortium accessibility standards, among others, to ensure that all productions will work with modern tools such as screen readers.

With the goal of making public domain works more accessible to modern audiences, archaic spellings are modernized and typographic quirks are addressed "so ebooks look like books and not text documents". This approach stands in contrast to that of Project Gutenberg.

All book covers are derived from public domain fine art. Volunteer ebook producers locate paintings suitable for the work they are producing.

Samples of Standard Ebook covers
Cover of The Adventures of Sherlock Holmes by Sir Arthur Conan Doyle

Cover of Little Women by Louisa May Alcott

Cover of Moby-Dick by Herman Melville
