= St Cuthbert, Seascale =

Coordinates: 54.3966°N 3.4833°W

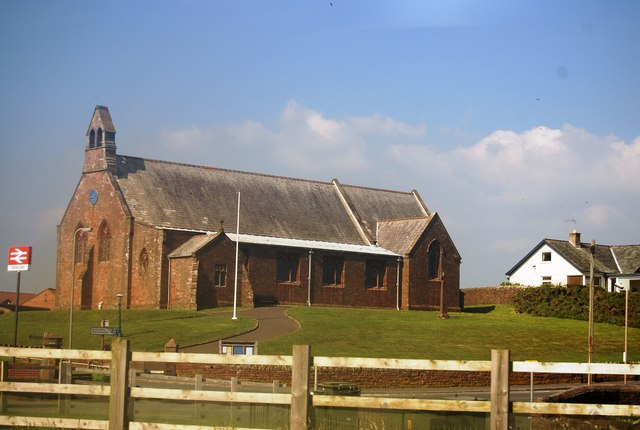
- St Cuthbert, Seascale

- Location in Cumbria
- OS grid reference: NY 0379001146
- Location: Seascale, Cumbria
- Country: England
- Denomination: Anglican

History
- Status: Parish church
- Dedication: St Cuthbert

Administration
- Province: York
- Diocese: Carlisle
- Archdeaconry: West Cumberland
- Deanery: Calder
- Parish: Seascale

Clergy
- Vicar: J. Riley

St Cuthbert's is in Seascale, Cumbria, England. It is an active Anglican parish church in the deanery of Calder, and the diocese of Carlisle. Its benefice is Seatallan. The church is a Grade II Listed Building.

== History ==
St Cuthbert's church was designed by C.J. Ferguson in 1890 and replaced the "Iron Church" a corrugated iron semi-permanent structure of 1881.

== Architecture ==
Built of the local red sandstone with a slate roof and bellcote with two bells. The interior space comprises a large nave, chancel and south aisle. The 'vesica' window with the holy dove and angels is by Seward and Co. inspired by the window at Holy Trinity church, Millom. There is stained glass in the chancel windows.

The pipe organ pipes are decorated with Fleur-de-lis was built by William Hill & Son in 1867 for St. Bees Priory was moved to St Cuthbert's church in 1897. The pews are a dark wood and movable. The octagonal marble font has a wrought iron top. In 2018 2/3 of pews have been replaced with stackable chairs and tables and 2 toilets and kitchenette have been added.

The church has no graveyard. The war memorial, which was designed by W. G. Collingwood, is in the churchyard. It is in sandstone and consists of a Celtic-type cross on a base of three rectangular steps. The cross has a tapering rectangular shaft, the front is decorated with Scandinavian interlace carving, and the back with a vine scroll. On the front is an inscription and the names of those lost in the First World War.
