= Online Books Page =

Index of e-text books on the Internet

The Online Books Page
- Producer: University of Pennsylvania (United States)
- History: 1993–present
- Languages: English

Access
- Cost: Free

Coverage
- Record depth: Index
- Format coverage: Books
- No. of records: Over 2 million

Links
- Website: onlinebooks.library.upenn.edu
- Title list(s): onlinebooks.library.upenn.edu

The Online Books Page is an index of e-text books available on the Internet. It is edited by John Mark Ockerbloom and is hosted by the library of the University of Pennsylvania. The Online Books Page lists over 2 million books and has several features, such as A Celebration of Women Writers and Banned Books Online.

The Online Books Page was the second substantial effort to catalog online texts, but the first to do so with the rigors required by library science. It first appeared on the Web in the summer of 1993. The Internet Public Library came shortly thereafter.

The web site was named one of the best free reference web sites in 2003 by the Machine-Assisted Reference Section of the American Library Association.

== See also ==
- Digital library
- List of digital library projects
- Project Gutenberg
- Internet Archive
