= Hugh Walpole bibliography =

Sir Hugh Seymour Walpole, a 20th-century English novelist, had a large and varied output. Between 1909 and 1941 he wrote thirty-six novels, five volumes of short stories, two original plays and three volumes of memoirs. His range included disturbing studies of the macabre, children's stories and historical fiction, most notably his "Herries" series, set in the Lake District.

== Books ==
Title	First published	British publisher	US publisher	Notes	Online edition
The Wooden Horse	1909	Smith, Elder	Doran		The Wooden Horse at Faded Page (Canada)
Maradick at Forty: A Transition	1910	Smith, Elder	Doran		Maradick at Forty: A Transition at Faded Page (Canada)
Mr Perrin and Mr Traill	1911	Mills and Boon	Doran	revised for the US version as The Gods and Mr Perrin: subsequently filmed (1948).	The Gods and Mr Perrin at Faded Page (Canada)
The Prelude to Adventure	1912	Mills and Boon	Doran		Prelude to Adventure at Faded Page (Canada)
Fortitude	1913	Martin Secker	Doran		Fortitude at Project Gutenberg
The Duchess of Wrexe, Her Decline and Death	1914	Martin Secker	Doran		The Duchess of Wrexe: Her Decline and Death at Faded Page (Canada)
The Golden Scarecrow	1915	Cassell	Doran	short stories: Prologue; Hugh Seymour; Henry Fitzgeorge Strether; Ernest Henry; Angelina; Bim Rochester; Nancy Ross; 'Enery; Barbara Flint; Sarah Trefusis; Young John Scarlet; Epilogue	The Golden Scarecrow at Faded Page (Canada)
The Dark Forest	1916	Martin Secker	Doran		The Dark Forest at Faded Page (Canada)
Joseph Conrad	1916	Nisbet	Henry Holt	Biography and criticism	Joseph Conrad at Project Gutenberg
The Green Mirror	1918	Macmillan	Doran		The Green Mirror at Faded Page (Canada)
The Secret City	1919	Macmillan	Doran		The Secret City at Project Gutenberg
Jeremy	1919	Cassell	Doran		Jeremy at Project Gutenberg
The Art of James Branch Cabell	1920	–	R M McBride		
The Captives	1920	Macmillan	Doran		The Captives at Faded Page (Canada)
The Thirteen Travellers	1920	Hutchinson	Doran	short stories: Absalom Jay; Fanny Close; The Hon Clive Torby; Miss Morganhurst; Peter Westcott; Lucy Moon; Mrs Porter and Miss Allen; Lois Drake; Mr Nix; Lizzie Rand; Nobody; Bombastes Furioso	The Thirteen Travellers at Project Gutenberg
The Young Enchanted	1921	Macmillan	Grosset and Dunlap		The Young Enchanted at Faded Page (Canada)
The Cathedral	1922	Macmillan	Doran		The Cathedral at Project Gutenberg
Jeremy and Hamlet	1923	Cassell	Doran		Jeremy and Hamlet at Faded Page (Canada)
The Crystal Box	1924	Privately published by Walpole	–	limited edition of 150 copies	
The Old Ladies	1924	Macmillan	Doran		The Old Ladies at Faded Page (Canada)
The English Novel: Some Notes on its Evolution	1924	Cambridge University Press	–	not published in the US until 1970 (Folcroft edition)	
Portrait of a Man with Red Hair	1925	Macmillan	Doran		Portrait of a Man with Red Hair at Faded Page (Canada)
Harmer John	1926	Macmillan	Doran		Harmer John at Project Gutenberg Australia
Reading: An Essay	1926	Jarrolds	–		
Jeremy at Crale	1927	Cassell	Doran		Jeremy at Crale at Faded Page (Canada)
Anthony Trollope	1928	Macmillan	Macmillan	Biography and criticism	
My Religious Experience	1928	Benn	–		
The Silver Thorn	1928	Macmillan	Doubleday	short stories: The Little Donkeys with the Crimson Saddles; The Tiger; No Unkindness Intended; Ecstasy; A Picture; Old Elizabeth (A Portrait); The Etching; Chinese Horses; The Tarn; Major Wilbraham; A Silly Old Fool; The Enemy; The Enemy in Ambush; The Dove; Bachelors	The Silver Thorn: A Book of Stories at Faded Page (Canada)
Wintersmoon	1928	Macmillan	Doubleday		Wintersmoon at Faded Page (Canada)
Farthing Hall	1929	Macmillan	Doubleday	with J B Priestley	
Hans Frost	1929	Macmillan	Doubleday		Hans Frost at Faded Page (Canada)
Rogue Herries	1930	Macmillan	Doubleday		Rogue Herries at Faded Page (Canada)
Above the Dark Circus	1931	Macmillan	Doubleday	published in the US as Above the Dark Tumult	Above the Dark Tumult at Project Gutenberg Australia
Judith Paris	1931	Macmillan	Doubleday		Judith Paris at Faded Page (Canada)
The Apple Trees: Four Reminiscences	1932	Golden Cockerel Press		–	limited edition of 500 copies
The Fortress	1932	Macmillan	Doubleday		The Fortress at Faded Page (Canada)
A Letter to a Modern Novelist	1932	Hogarth			A Letter to a Modern Novelist at Faded Page (Canada)
All Souls' Night	1933	Macmillan	Doubleday	short stories: The Whistle; The Silver Mask; The Staircase; A Carnation for an Old Man; Tarnhelm – or The Death of my Uncle Robert; Mr Oddy; Seashore Macabre – A Moment's Experience; Lilac; The Oldest Talland; The Little Ghost; Mrs Lunt; Sentimental but True; Portrait in Shadow; The Snow; The Ruby Glass; Spanish Dusk	All Soul's Night at Faded Page (Canada)
Vanessa	1933	Macmillan	Doubleday		Vanessa at Faded Page (Canada)
Extracts from a Diary	1934	Privately published by Walpole			
Captain Nicholas	1934	Macmillan	Doubleday		Captain Nicholas at Project Gutenberg Australia
Cathedral Carol Service	1934	Faber and Faber	–	an episode from "The Inquisitor"	
The Inquisitor	1935	Macmillan	Doubleday		The Inquisitor at Faded Page (Canada)
Claude Houghton: Appreciations	1935	Heinemann	–	with Clemence Dane	
A Prayer for My Son	1936	Macmillan	Doubleday		A Prayer for my Son at Project Gutenberg Australia
John Cornelius: His Life and Adventures	1937	Macmillan	Doubleday		John Cornelius... at Faded Page (Canada)
Head in Green Bronze and Other Stories	1938	Macmillan	Doubleday	short stories: Head in Green Bronze; The German; The Exile; The Train; The Haircut; Let The Bores Tremble; The Honey-Box; The Fear of Death; The Field with Five Trees; Having No Hearts; The Conjurer	Head in Green Bronze at Faded Page (Canada)
The Joyful Delaneys	1938	Macmillan	Doubleday		The Joyful Delaneys at Faded Page (Canada)
The Sea Tower	1939	Macmillan	Doubleday		The Sea Tower at Faded Page (Canada)
Roman Fountain	1940	Macmillan	Doubleday		Roman Fountain at Faded Page (Canada)
The Bright Pavilions	1940	Macmillan	Doubleday		The Bright Pavilions at Faded Page (Canada)
The Blind Man's House	1941	Macmillan	Doubleday		The Blind Man's House at Faded Page (Canada)
Open Letter of an Optimist	1941	Macmillan	–		
The Killer and the Slain	1942	Macmillan	Doubleday		The Killer and the Slain at Project Gutenberg Australia
Katherine Christian	1943	Macmillan	Doubleday	UK publication 1944	Katherine Christian at Faded Page (Canada)
Mr Huffam and Other Stories	1948	Macmillan		short stories: The White Cat; The Train to the Sea; The Perfect Close; Service for the Blind; The Faithful Servant; Miss Thom; Women are Motherly; The Beard; The Last Trump; Green Tie; The Church in the Snow; Mr Huffam – A Christmas Story	Mr Huffam and Other Stories at the Internet Archive

=== Book series ===
Some of Walpole's stories were parts of series with related themes:

- The London Novels were Fortitude, The Duchess of Wrexe, The Green Mirror, The Captives, The Young Enchanted, Wintersmoon, Hans Frost and Captain Nicholas.
- Scenes from Provincial Life included The Cathedral, The Old Ladies, Harmer John and The Inquisitor.
- The Herries Chronicle comprises Rogue Herries, Judith Paris, The Fortress and Vanessa. Two later Herries books were The Bright Pavilions and Katherine Christian.
- The Jeremy stories were Jeremy, Jeremy and Hamlet and Jeremy at Crale.
- Four Fantastic Tales were Maradick at Forty, Prelude to Adventure, Portrait of a Man with Red Hair and Above the Dark Circus.

== Short stories ==
The following stories appeared in The Windsor Magazine:

- "The Dog and the Dragon in Reminiscence" (October 1923)
- "Red Amber" (December 1923)
- "The Garrulous Diplomatist" (December 1924)
- "The Adventure of Mrs Farbman" (January 1925)
- "The Adventure of the Imaginative Child" (February 1925)
- "The Happy Optimist" (March 1925)
- "The Dyspeptic Critic" (April 1925)
- "The Man Who Lost His Identity" (May 1925)
- "The Adventure of the Beautiful Things" (June 1925)
- "The War Babies are Growing Up!" (November 1934)

== Other works ==
=== Plays ===
- The Young Huntress, 1933
- The Cathedral (adaptation of his 1922 novel), 1936
- The Haxtons, 1939

=== Editor ===
In 1932 Walpole edited The Waverley Pageant: Best Passages from the Novels of Sir Walter Scott. In 1937 he edited a compilation of short stories, A Second Century of Creepy Stories (Hutchinson, 1937), by a range of writers including Guy de Maupassant, M. R. James, Henry James, Walter de la Mare, Oliver Onions, Walpole himself ("Tarnhelm") and twenty-one others.

== Sources ==
- Hart-Davis, Rupert (1997) [1952]. Hugh Walpole. Stroud, Gloucestershire: Sutton. pp. 481–483. ISBN 0750914912.
- "Hugh Walpole", Contemporary Authors Online, Gale Group. Retrieved 23 November 2013 (subscription required)
- "Walpole, Sir Hugh Seymour", Who Was Who, A & C Black, 1920–2007 online edition, Oxford University Press, December 2007. Retrieved 23 November 2013 (subscription required)
- "Hugh Walpole", WorldCat. Retrieved 5 January 2014
