= Project Gutenberg Canada =

Canadian digital library

- Established: July 1, 2007; 19 years ago
- Dissolved: October 2026

Project Gutenberg Canada, also known as Project Gutenburg of Canada, was a Canadian digital library founded July 1, 2007 by Dr. Mark Akrigg. The website allowed Canadian residents to create e-texts and download books, including those that are otherwise not in the public domain in other countries.

It is not formally affiliated with the original Project Gutenberg, though both share the common objective of making public domain books available for free to the general public as e-books. Project Gutenburg Canada primarily focuses on works by Canadian authors or about Canada, as well as works in Canadian French.

Distributed Proofreaders Canada began contributing ebooks to Project Gutenberg Canada when launched on December 1, 2007.

As of October 2026, the website no longer houses ebooks and is now owned by the World Library Foundation.

== Canadian public domain ==
On January 1, 2022, the Copyright law of Canada was changed. Prior to this date authors who died 50 or more years ago are in the public domain. In 2022 the author date criterion was increased to 70 years. The law was not retroactive. Authors who died between 1952 and 1971 are still in the public domain. Authors who died in 1972 will not become public domain until 2043. Project Gutenberg Canada has received permission to redistribute books still under copyright in some cases.

Some authors whose works have entered the public domain in Canada and are thus available on Project Gutenberg Canada are A. A. Milne, Walter de la Mare, Sheila Kaye-Smith, Amy Carmichael, Gertrude Lawrence, Marshall Broomhall, Lilias Trotter, Laura Ingalls Wilder, Isobel Kuhn, and George Orwell.

== See also ==
- Project Gutenberg Australia
- Open access in Canada
