= Distributed Proofreaders Canada =

Web-based proofreading project

- Available in: English, French
- Website: www.pgdpcanada.net; www.fadedpage.com
- Commercial: No
- Registration: Required
- Launched: December 1, 2007; 18 years ago
- Current status: Active
- Content license: Public Domain
- Written in: PHP

Distributed Proofreaders Canada (DP Canada) is a volunteer organization that transfers books into electronic format and releases them as public domain books in formats readable by electronic devices. It was launched in December 2007 and as of 2026 has published about 8,000 books. Books that are released are stored on a book archive called Faded Page. While its focus is on Canadian publications and preserving Canadiana, it also includes books from other countries as well. It is modelled after Distributed Proofreaders, and performs the same function as similar projects in other parts of the world such as Project Gutenberg in the United States and Project Gutenberg Australia.

== History ==
Distributed Proofreaders Canada was launched in December 2007 by David Jones and Michael Shepard. Although it was established by members of the original Distributed Proofreaders site, it is a separate entity. It is a volunteer-based, non-profit organization. All the administrative and management costs are borne by its members. The software used by DP Canada was originally downloaded from SourceForge but has been substantially modified since then and the source code is now hosted on GitHub.

In addition to preserving Canadiana, DP Canada is notable because it is one of the first major efforts to take advantage of Canada's copyright laws which allows more works to be preserved. Unlike copyright law in other countries, Canada had until 2022 a "life plus 50" copyright term. Works by authors who died before 1972 became part of the public domain. Starting in 2023, this was changed to life plus 70. Therefore works by authors who died in 1972 won't become public domain until 2043. Other countries have differing copyright laws. Although files available through DP Canada are publicly available in other countries, the onus is on the reader to ensure that they only download material that is not in copyright in their country of residence.

Notable Canadian authors whose books have been published include Stephen Leacock, L. M. Montgomery, E. T. Seton and Mazo de la Roche. Authors whose works have been released in Canada but not other parts of the world include A. A. Milne, C. S. Lewis, Winston Churchill, E. E. Smith, Amy Carmichael, and Albert Camus.

== Proofreading ==
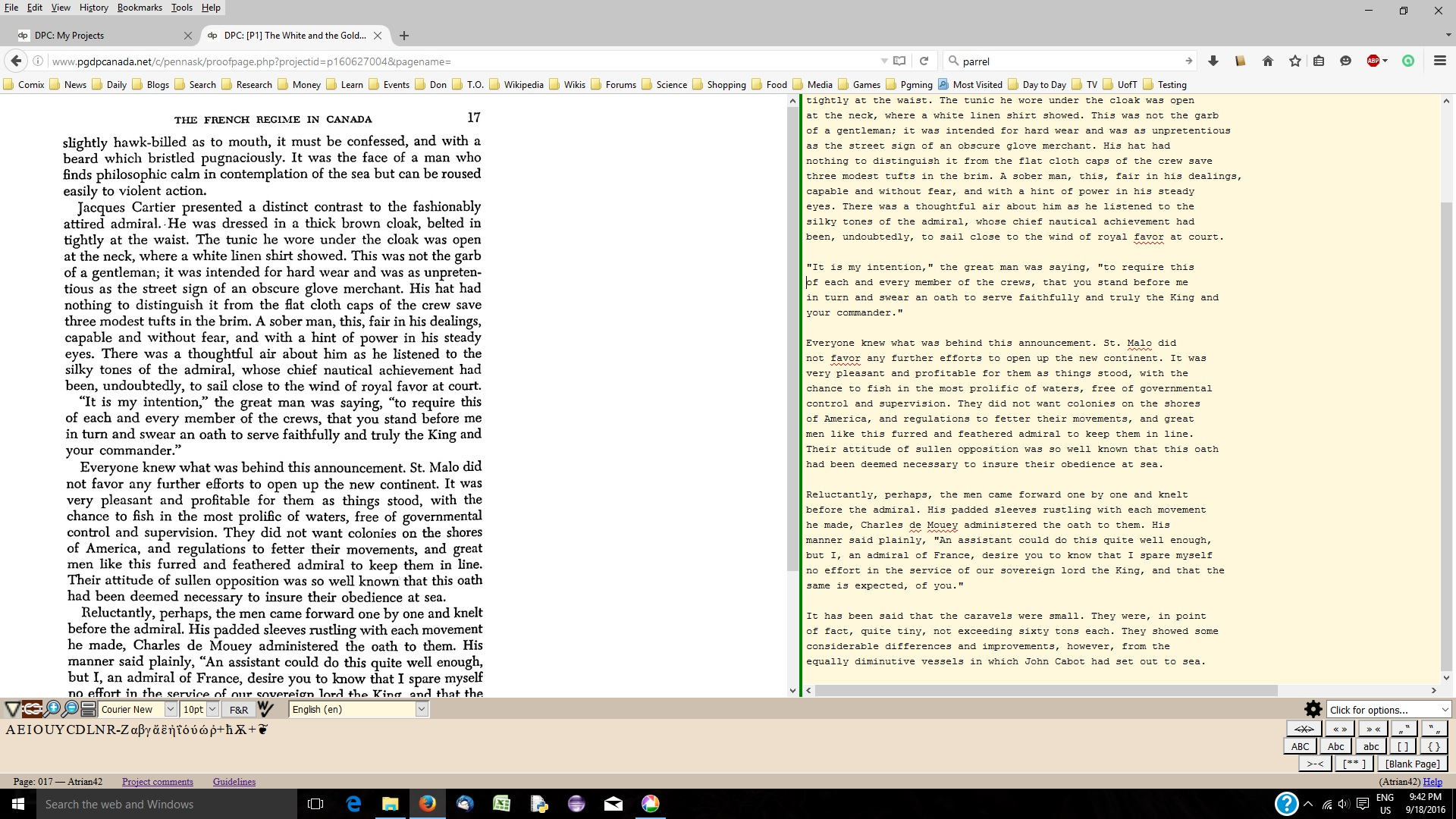
Proofreading software showing original text on left and edited text on the right

Eligible books are chosen by members for publication based on personal interest and access. Every book is vetted to ensure that the author and any other content provider such as illustrators and translators are in the public domain. Books are scanned electronically and each page is uploaded to the proofreading website. A project is created for the book and is made available to the proofreading members. Each book is proofread in three stages called 'P1', 'P2' and 'P3'. During the first stage, errors in scanning and other minor errors are corrected. Once all pages in the book have been edited the book pages are promoted to the next stage, P2. The proofreading is repeated and again in stage P3 to ensure no errors make it to the final publication.

Once stage P3 is finished the book moves to a set of two formatting stages called 'F1', and 'F2'. In these stages the book text is changed into a format that allows it to be presented to the reader in a style that resembles the original book as closely as possible. For example, text originally appearing in italic type is placed within formatting tags <i>this text is in italics</i>. When formatted the text appears correctly as this text is in italics.

When the formatting stages are complete, a post-processing stage brings all the files together to publish the books in five electronic formats. These include ePub, mobi, HTML, PDF and plain text. The HTML version is also made available as a Zip file.

Before the books are added to the Faded Page book archive, the books are placed in a final round called 'Smooth Reading'. While in this phase, members of DP Canada are encouraged to download the books and read them. While the books are in this phase, comments about the book for possible improvements can be sent to the post processor. Once past the Smooth Reading process, the publication is posted on Faded Page.

== Publication ==
The books that are published by DP Canada in the public domain are made available through the Faded Page book archive. Some of the publications released are also posted to the Project Gutenberg Canada (PG Canada) website. PG Canada is a book archive that does not perform proofreading tasks.

== See also ==
- List of digital library projects
