= Project Rastko =

Project Rastko — Internet Library of Serb Culture (Serbian: Пројекат Растко — Електронска библиотека српске културе, Projekat Rastko — Elektronska biblioteka srpske kulture) is a non-profit and non-governmental publishing, cultural and educational project dedicated to Serb and Serb-related arts and humanities. It is named after Rastko Nemanjić.

== Project ==
The project was established in 1997 as a part of a pan-regional Balkans Cultural Network Initiative. Its main activities are:

- electronic publishing in the fields of Serbian and Serbian-related arts and humanities
- scientific and cultural conferences and studies about Balkan cultural-civilizational integration
- bilateral and multilateral activities with other Balkan and world countries
- establishing regional centres
- technical training

The apex of the project is its electronic library with more than half a gigabyte of material, comprising electronic books and articles, photographs and comics. Although most texts are Serbian, there is a body of material in other languages, again mostly in English and Russian, but also in French, German, Spanish, and other languages.

The library contains material in both the public domain and copyrighted texts published with the authors' permissions, dating from earliest medieval Serb texts to contemporary science fiction. The site of the project also hosts several sites not directly related to the project.

Project Rastko also hosts the European version of Distributed Proofreaders, which intends to supply Project Gutenberg with public domain texts in European languages. Project Rastko is organising a coalition of European e-libraries for the purpose of collecting public domain works, aiming to eventually have a node of Distributed Proofreaders in each European country.

== Centres ==
Currently (2007) the project has following regional centres:

1. Denmark (Projekt Rastko — Denmark, network of electronic libraries and achievements regarding Danish culture and Danish-Serbian cultural and historical links)
2. Republic of Macedonia (Project Rastko — Macedonia, electronic library of culture and tradition of Macedonia)
3. Russia (Project Rastko — Russia)
4. The Drina (Project Rastko — The Drina, electronic library of culture and tradition of the Drina)
5. Kashubians (Project Rastko — Kashubia, e-library of culture and tradition of Kashubians)
6. Slovenia (Project Rastko — Slovenia, e-library of Slovenian-Serbian cultural ties)
7. Gora (Project Rastko — Gora, e-library of culture and tradition of Gora and Goranies)
8. Poland (Project Rastko — Poland, library of Polish-Serbian cultural links)
9. Lusatia (Project Rastko — Lusatia, electronic library of Sorbian-Serbian cultural ties)
10. Bulgaria (Project Rastko — Bulgaria, library of Bulgarian-Serbian cultural links)
11. Albania (Project Rastko — Shkoder, library of Slavs in Albania and Albanian-Slavic cultural links)
12. Bosnian Krajina (Project Rastko — Banja Luka, electronic library of culture and tradition of the Bosnian Krajina)
13. Ukraine (Project Rastko — Kiev-Lavov, electronic library of Ukrainian-Serbian cultural links)
14. Hungary (Project Rastko — Budapest-Saint Andrew, library of culture and tradition of the Serbs in Hungary)
15. Bay of Kotor (Project Rastko — Bay of Kotor, electronic library of culture and tradition of Bocca)
16. Montenegro (Project Rastko — Cetinje, electronic library of culture and tradition of Montenegro)
17. Kosovo (Project Rastko — Kosovo and Metohija, electronic library of culture and tradition of the southern Serbian province)
18. Romania (Project Rastko — Romania, library of the culture of Serbs in Romania)
19. Italy (Rastko Project — Italy, electronic library of Serbian-Italian cultural links)

Each of them is autonomous, and develops its projects and activities through local academic, cultural, media NGOs and individuals, including strong co-operation with ethnic minorities centres. Future activities of Belgrade centre will include projects about Slovak, Jewish and Roma/Gypsy as well as for 29 other ethnocultural minorities in South-Eastern Europe.

== See also ==
- List of digital library projects
