= Rogue Herries =

Novel by Hugh Walpole

- Title page for Rogue Herries (1930)
- Author: Hugh Walpole
- Language: English
- Genre: Historical romance
- Publisher: Macmillan (UK); Doubleday, Doran (US)
- Publication date: 1930
- Publication place: United Kingdom
- Media type: Print

Rogue Herries is a historical romance novel by Hugh Walpole which was first published in 1930. It is set in Cumberland in the 18th century. The title character is Francis Herries who is nicknamed Rogue for his wild and reckless ways.

The novel was the first of several about the Herries family – the Herries Chronicles. The story was inspired partly by Walpole's love of creating family trees and their imaginary history. It was also inspired by his childhood in Gosforth, where he started an adventure story about smugglers on the Cumberland coast there – his first attempt at writing.

When published by Doubleday in the US, it was #7 in the Publishers Weekly list of bestselling novels for 1930.
