= Variant object =

Variant objects in the context of HTTP are objects served by an Origin Content Server in a type of transmitted data variation (i.e. uncompressed, compressed, different languages, etc.).

HTTP/1.1 (1997–1999) introduces Content/Accept headers. These are used in HTTP requests and responses to state which variant the data is presented in.

== Example scenario ==
Client:

GET /encoded_data.html HTTP/1.1
Host: www.example.com
Accept-Encoding: gzip

Server:

HTTP/1.1 200 OK 
Server: http-example-server
Content-Length: 23
Content-Encoding: gzip

<23 bytes of gzip compressed data>

== See also ==
- Content negotiation
- HTTP
- HTTP compression
- List of HTTP headers
