= HTTP header injection =

Web application security vulnerability

HTTP header injection is a general class of web application security vulnerability which occurs when Hypertext Transfer Protocol (HTTP) headers are dynamically generated based on user input. Header injection in HTTP responses can allow for HTTP response splitting, session fixation via the Set-Cookie header, cross-site scripting (XSS), and malicious redirect attacks via the location header. XSS attacks can be blocked with the use of a browser extension such as NoScript or Malwarebytes Browser Guard.

== Sources ==
- File Download Injection
- OWASP HTTP request Splitting
- OWASP Testing for HTTP Splitting/Smuggling
- HTTP Smuggling in 2015
- NoScript Official Website

== See also ==
- HTTP request smuggling
