= HTTP 403 =

HTTP status code indicating that access is forbidden to a resource

HTTP 403 is an HTTP status code meaning access to the requested resource is forbidden. The server understood the request, but will not fulfill it, even if it was correct.

== Specifications ==
HTTP 403 provides a distinct error case from HTTP 401; while HTTP 401 is returned when the client has not authenticated, and implies that a successful response may be returned following valid authentication, HTTP 403 is returned when the client is not permitted access to the resource despite providing authentication such as insufficient permissions of the authenticated account. (Note: See #Substatus error codes for IIS for possible reasons of why a webserver may refuse to fulfill a request.)

Error 403: "The server understood the request, but is refusing to authorize it."

Error 401: "The 401 (Unauthorized) status code indicates that the request has not been applied because it lacks valid authentication credentials for the target resource."

The Apache web server returns 403 Forbidden in response to requests for URL paths that corresponded to file system directories when directory listings have been disabled in the server and there is no Directory Index directive to specify an existing file to be returned to the browser. Some administrators configure the Mod proxy extension to Apache to block such requests and this will also return 403 Forbidden. Microsoft IIS responds in the same way when directory listings are denied in that server. In WebDAV, the 403 Forbidden response will be returned by the server if the client issued a PROPFIND request but did not also issue the required Depth header or issued a Depth header of infinity.

== Examples ==
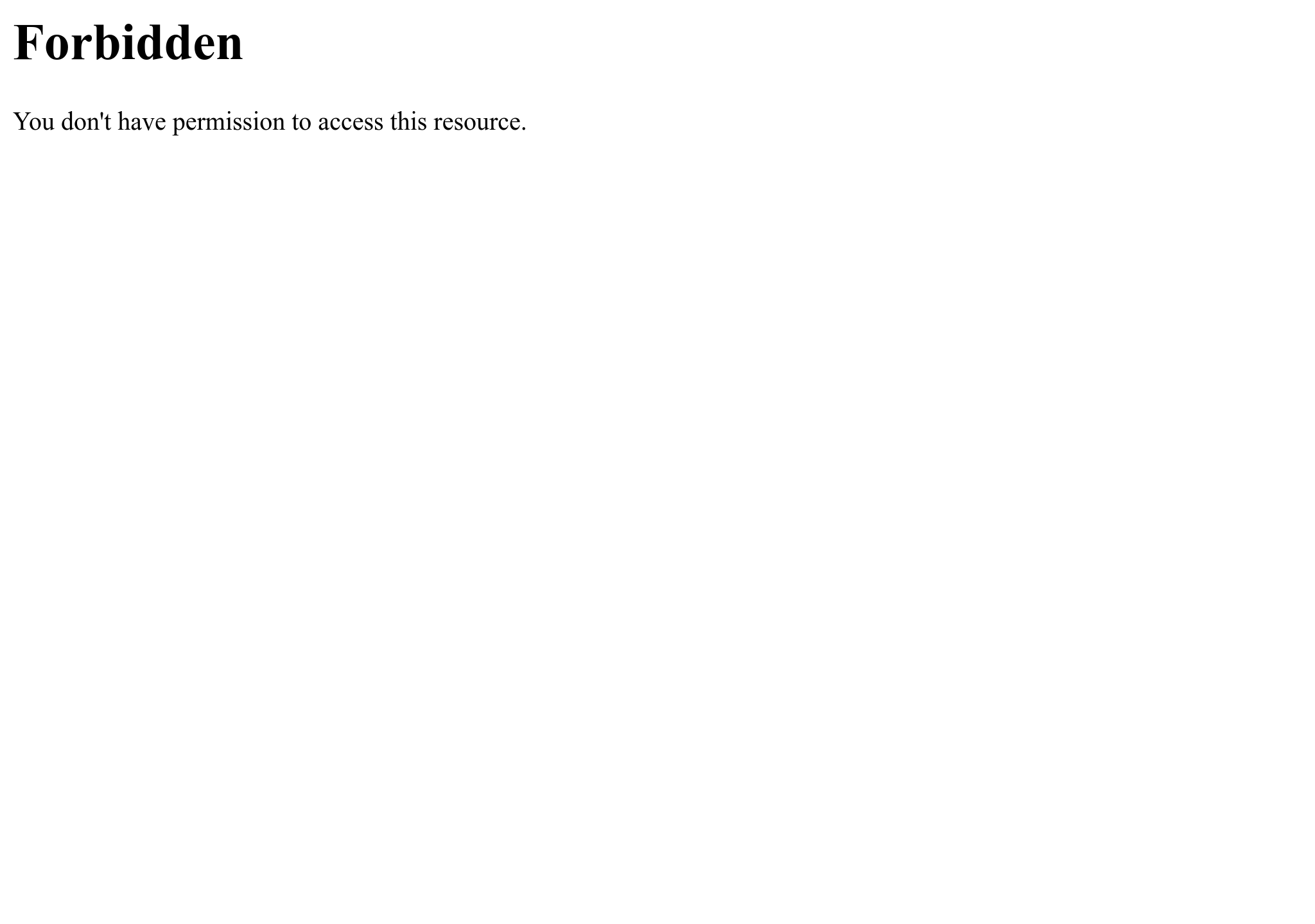
MediaWiki error message

Client request:

GET /hello.html HTTP/1.1
Host: www.example.org
Authentication: Bearer 1b2c3d4e5f6

Server response:

HTTP/1.1 403 Forbidden
Content-Type: text/html

<html>
   <head><title>403 Forbidden</title></head>
   <body>
      <h1>Forbidden</h1>
      <p>You don't have permission to access /hello.html on this server.</p>
   </body>
</html>

== See also ==
- List of HTTP status codes
- URL redirection
