= HTTP parameter pollution =

Web security vulnerability

HTTP Parameter Pollution (HPP) is a web application vulnerability exploited by injecting encoded query string delimiters in already existing parameters. The vulnerability occurs if user input is not correctly encoded for output by a web application. This vulnerability allows the injection of parameters into web application-created URLs. It was first brought forth to the public in 2009 by Stefano di Paola and Luca Carettoni, in the conference OWASP EU09 Poland. The impact of such vulnerability varies, and it can range from "simple annoyance" to complete disruption of the intended behavior of a web application. Overriding HTTP parameters to alter a web application's behavior, bypassing input and access validation checkpoints, as well as other indirect vulnerabilities, are possible consequences of a HPP attack.

There is no RFC standard on what should be done when it has passed multiple parameters. HPP could be used for cross channel pollution, bypassing CSRF protection and WAF input validation checks.

== Behaviour ==
When they are passed multiple parameters with the same name, here is how various back ends behave.

Behaviour when "param" is passed the values "val1" & "val2"
Technology	Parsing result	Example
ASP.NET/IIS	All occurrences concatenated with a comma	param=val1,val2
ASP/IIS	All occurrences concatenated with a comma	param=val1,val2
PHP/Apache	Last occurrence only	param=val2
PHP/Zeus	Last occurrence only	param=val2
JSP, Servlet/Apache Tomcat	First occurrence only	param=val1
JSP, Servlet/Oracle Application Server	First occurrence only	param=val1
JSP, Servlet/Jetty	First occurrence only	param=val1
IBM Lotus Domino	Last occurrence only	param=val2
IBM HTTP Server	First occurrence only	param=val1
mod_perl,libapreq2/Apache	First occurrence only	param=val1
Perl CGI/Apache	First occurrence only	param=val1
mod_wsgi (Python)/Apache	First occurrence only	param=val1
Python/Zope	All occurrences in list(array)	param=['val1','val2']

== Types ==
=== Client-side ===
- First Order / Reflected HPP
- Second Order / Stored HPP
- Third Order / DOM HPP

=== Server-side ===
- Standard HPP
- Second Order HPP

== Prevention ==
Proper input validation and awareness about web technology on HPP is protection against HTTP Parameter Pollution.

== See also ==
- HTTP response splitting
- HTTP request smuggling

== Bibliography ==
- Balduzzi, Marco; Torrano-Gimenez, Carmen; Balzarotti, Davide; Kirda, Engin (2011). Automated Discovery of Parameter Pollution Vulnerabilities in Web Applications. Proceedings of the Network and Distributed System Security Symposium, NDSS 2011 – via ResearchGate.
