= HPP =

HPP may refer to:

== Medicine ==
- Allopurinol, a medication
- Hereditary pyropoikilocytosis, a blood disorder
- HPP epoxidase, an enzyme
- Hypokalemic periodic paralysis, a muscle disease
- Hypophosphatasia, a bone disease
- Hypoxia preconditioned plasma

== Other uses ==
- Hardy-Pomeau-Pazzis model, in computational fluid dynamics
- Harrington Park Press, an American publisher
- Harris Performance Products, a British motorcycle racing/parts manufacturer
- Hawaiian Paradise Park, a community on the island of Hawaii
- Head Phones President, a Japanese metal band
- Health Partners Plans, a health insurance network
- High Performance Programme, in cricket
- High pressure processing of food
- Holme Pierrepont National Watersports Centre, in England
- Human Proteome Project
- Hydroelectric power plant
- Hydrometallurgy Pilot Plant, in Egypt
- C++ Header file
- Headturn Preference Procedure, in statistical language acquisition
- Honda Power Port, a type of two-stroke power valve system
- Handan East railway station, China Railway telegraph code HPP
- Hosted Payment Page (also known as Hosted Checkout), used in ecommerce for secure checkouts.
- HTTP parameter pollution
