= PHPMailer =

Toolset for sending emails

- Original author: Brent R. Matzelle
- Developers: (2001-2007) Brent R. Matzelle (2007-2012) Andy Prevost (2010-2012) Jim Jagielski (July 2012- ) Marcus Bointon
- Release: 2001; 25 years ago
- Stable release: 7.1.1 / 2026-05-18; 5 months ago
- Written in: PHP
- Operating system: Cross-platform
- Available in: over 50 languages
- License: LGPL
- Website: github.com/PHPMailer/PHPMailer
- Repository: github.com/PHPMailer/PHPMailer

Blue arrows can be implemented using SMTP variations.

PHPMailer is a code library to send (transport) emails safely and easily via PHP code from a web server (MUA to the MSA server).

Sending emails directly by PHP code requires a high-level familiarity to SMTP standards (RFC 821, 2821, 5321) and related issues (such as Carriage return) and vulnerabilities about email injection for spamming. Since 2001 PHPMailer has become one of the most popular solutions for these matters on PHP.

== Features ==
Partial list of features:

- Plain text, HTML and multipart batched files
- SSL and TLS (Secure Sockets Layer and Transport Layer Security)
- SMTP, Qmail, POP3
- Debugging system
- PHP sendmail and mail methods
- IDN
- DKIM

== History ==
- PHPMailer was originally written in 2001 by Brent R. Matzelle as a SourceForge project.
- Andy Prevost (codeworxtech) took over the project in 2007.
- Became an Apache incubator project on Google Code in 2010, managed by Jim Jagielski.
- Marcus Bointon (coolbru on sourceforge) contributed to the project and joined as an admin in July 2012.
- Marcus created his fork on GitHub.
- Jim and Marcus decide to join forces and use GitHub as the canonical and official repo for PHPMailer.
- PHPMailer moved to the PHPMailer organization on GitHub.
- Late 2016, a serious security flaw was discovered in PHPMailer, that had to be patched twice.

== Popularity ==
Worx International Inc claimed in 2009 that: "PHPMailer continues to be the world's most popular transport class, with an estimated 9 million [message user agents] worldwide. Downloads continue at a significant pace daily."

PHPMailer sends an SMTP extension command with the sent emails as below which can be used to get the usage report of PHPMailer on the ESPs (Email Service Providers):

X-Mailer: PHPMailer 5.2.13 (https://github.com/PHPMailer/PHPMailer)

This SMTP header may differ for different versions of PHPMailer, and can also be suppressed or modified by PHP code. It also comes with Integrated SMTP support which means you can send emails without a local mail server.
