= H2O (web server) =

- Original author(s): Kazuho Oku; DeNA
- Initial release: February 18, 2015; 10 years ago
- Stable release: 2.2.6 / August 13, 2019; 5 years ago
- Repository: github.com/h2o/h2o
- Written in: C
- Operating system: Unix-like
- Type: Web server
- License: MIT License
- Website: h2o.examp1e.net

H2O is a free and open-source web server. It is written in C, and is distributed under the terms of the MIT License.

It was designed with a focus on supporting HTTP/2 and TLS, maximizing the use of new web technologies such as prioritization and server push. As a result it achieves significantly better performance than conventional web servers such as nginx.

== Features ==
H2O has the following key features:

- HTTP/1.0 and HTTP/1.1 support
- HTTP/2 support
  - Full support for dependency and weight-based prioritization with server-side tweaks
  - Cache-aware server push
- HTTP/3 support (experimental)
- TCP Fast Open
- TLS support
  - Session resumption (standalone and memcached)
  - Session tickets with automatic key rollover
  - Automatic OCSP stapling
  - Forward secrecy and fast AEAD cipher suite
  - Private key protection using privilege separation
  - Encrypted Client Hello (experimental)
- Static file serving
- FastCGI support
- Reverse proxy
- Scripting using mruby (Rack-based)
- Graceful restart and self-upgrade

== History ==
In July 2014, Kazuho Oku started development of H2O for usage as a server for mobile games while working at DeNA. The initial version was released in December 2014, and the first stable version was released in February 2015 when the HTTP/2 specification was finalized.

== See also ==
- Fastly - The largest user of H2O in the world. Oku joined Fastly in January 2017.
