= Nghttp2 =

HTTP/2 library in C

nghttp2
- Original author(s): Tatsuhiro Tsujikawa
- Initial release: 2013
- Stable release: 1.66.0 / 17 June 2025; 21 days ago
- Repository: github.com/nghttp2/nghttp2
- Written in: C
- Platform: macOS, Windows, POSIX
- Type: HTTP/2 implementation
- License: MIT License
- Website: nghttp2.org

nghttp2 is a C library. It is an implementation of HTTP/2.

== History ==
nghttp2 was created by Tatsuhiro Tsujikawa as a derivative of spdylay, an implementation of SPDY, a communications protocol created by Google in 2009, in C.

Several well-known projects use nghttp2 to implement HTTP/2, including Apache and cURL.

== Features ==
=== HTTP/2 implementation ===
nghttp2 will send a WINDOW_UPDATE frame upon consuming more than half of the flow control window. For instance, if the sender specifies the SETTINGS_INITIAL_WINDOW_SIZE [sic] as 65,535 octets in the SETTINGS frame, nghttp2 will send a WINDOW_UPDATE frame upon exceeding 32,768 octets. The initial window size may be changed using the -w and -W flags.

=== Tools ===
nghttp2 offers multiple tools. nghttp is a command-line tool that uses nghttp2 to output HTTP/2 messages from a URL. nghttp's dependency-based priority is based on Firefox; when a connection is established, nghttp sends five PRIORITY frames. Other tools provided include nghttpd, an HTTP/2 server, nghttpx, an HTTP/2 proxy, h2load, an HTTP/2 load testing tool, and inflatehd and deflatehd, tools to decompress and compress using the HPACK header compression algorithm.

=== nghttp3 ===
nghttp3 is an implementation of HTTP/3 in C and authored by Tsujikawa. nghttp3 uses the QUIC network protocol designed by Jim Roskind at Google.
