= Cyberpanel =

Cyberpanel is a widely used free web hosting control panel. It is designed to be installed on VPS servers to manage the server's security, apps, configuration, and permissions. Cyberpanel is a free alternative to cPanel. It has gained a lot of traction among developers, bloggers, and small hosting companies because it integrates directly with OpenLiteSpeed, a fast WordPress server alternative to LiteSpeed, nginx, or Apache server.

The panel features a graphic user interface (GUI) that lets users perform common server management operations, including installing WordPress in one click, managing databases, setting up email accounts and local user accounts on the VPS, and configuring DNS records without needing intimate knowledge of Linux command-line.

Cyberpanel has a free tier and a paid tier. The free tier comes with OpenLiteSpeed, while the paid tier (Cyberpanel Enterprise) automatically switches to the commercial LiteSpeed Web Server.

Cyberpanel connects directly with LSCache for WordPress, Joomla, and Magento, which optimizes site speed automatically at the server level.

Due to the kernel-level security modifications, installing Cyberpanel to a VPS is a one-way operation.

== Reputation ==
Reviews of Cyberpanel express concerns about the user experience, security, and health of the project.

In 2024, a PSAUX ransomware attack targeted 22,000 Cyberpanel instances.

"This week, security researcher DreyAnd disclosed that CyberPanel 2.3.6 (and likely 2.3.7) suffers from three distinct security problems that can result in an exploit allowing unauthenticated remote root access without authentication."

== One-Click Installers ==
Cyberpanel provides one-click installers, similar to cPanel.

- WordPress + LSCache
- Joomla
- Git
- Prestashop
- Magento
- Mautic - open-source marketing automation
