= HTTP Speed+Mobility =

Experimental network protocol

HTTP Speed+Mobility was an experimental open-specification communication protocol developed primarily at Microsoft for transporting web content. HTTP Speed+Mobility was similar to HTTP, with particular goals to reduce web page load latency and improve web security. As a revision of Google's SPDY protocol, Microsoft's HTTP Speed+Mobility protocol achieved reduced latency through SPDY's use of compression, multiplexing, and prioritization.

== Relation to HTTP ==
HTTP Speed+Mobility,being built on SPDY does not replace HTTP. Rather, it modifies the way HTTP requests and responses are sent over the wire; this means that all the existing server-side applications can be used without modification if a SPDY-compatible translation layer is put in place. When sent over SPDY, the HTTP requests are processed, tokenized, simplified and compressed. For example, each SPDY end-point keeps track of which headers have been sent in the past requests and can avoid resending the headers that have not changed; those that must be sent are sent compressed.

In developing HTTP Speed+Mobility, Microsoft built upon both Google's proven SPDY protocol and on WebSocket, which is a web technology providing for bi-directional, full-duplex communications channels over a single TCP connection.

Besides support of the framing of WebSockets, changes from SPDY include the following: taking mobile phones and other low-power devices into account and the removal of SPDY’s obligatory use of CPU-intensive features – encryption, compression, and server-side push.

The IETF working group for HTTPbis has begun working on HTTP/2 and chose SPDY as the starting point.

== See also ==
- SPDY
- HTTP pipelining
- HTTP persistent connection
- WebSocket
- Waka (protocol)
