= ShimmerCat =

Image optimization service

- Original author(s): Zunzun AB
- Initial release: 2015-11-05
- Written in: Haskell
- Operating system: OS X, Linux
- Type: Web server
- Website: shimmercat.com

ShimmerCat was a web server designed from ground-up for HTTP/2 and written in Haskell; it now appears to be an image optimization and distribution service. The purported purpose of the server was to take full advantage of HTTP/2 features, including HTTP/2 Server Push, to enhance the perceived page load speed of served websites. ShimmerCat used machine learning to accelerate asset delivery to the browser.

== Overview ==
As of September 2016, ShimmerCat was at version 1.5.0 and ran on Linux and OS X. The software could be used for development of web applications through its SOCKS5 and HTTP/2 implementations, and it was also possible to develop web applications without having to modify /etc/hosts nor use different sets of URLs for development and production.
