= Igor Sysoev =

Russian software engineer (born 1970)

- Born: 28 September 1970 (age 55); Alma-Ata, Soviet Union (now Almaty, Kazakhstan)
- Education: Bauman Moscow State Technical University
- Known for: nginx
- Website: sysoev.ru/en/

Igor Vladimirovich Sysoev (Russian: Игорь Владимирович Сысоев) is a Russian software engineer. In October 2004, he released the nginx web server, reverse proxy, load balancer and HTTP cache software and founded Nginx, Inc.

Sysoev was born in 1970 and grew up in Almaty, Kazakhstan, at the time called Alma-Ata in the Kazakh SSR. Sysoev graduated from Bauman Moscow State Technical University in 1994. Since graduation, he has lived in Moscow.

On 13 December 2019, Sysoev was detained by the authorities concerning what has been asserted to be a copyright claim, on the basis that Sysoev was an employee of Rambler in the 2000s when he wrote the early versions of nginx. On 16 December 2019, Russian state lender Sberbank, which owns 46.5 percent of Rambler, called an extraordinary meeting of Rambler's board of directors asking Rambler's management team to request Russian law enforcement agencies cease pursuit of the criminal case, and begin talks with nginx and its owner F5.

On 18 January 2022, it was announced that Sysoev had left Nginx, Inc. and F5, Inc. "to spend more time with his friends and family and to pursue personal projects".

== Biography ==
=== Early years ===
Igor was born in a small town in Kazakhstan, then part of the USSR into a family of a Soviet military. Later his father was transferred to Alma-Ata, where Igor lived until the age of 18. His computer experience started with Yamaha MSX computers at the local Pioneers Palace (youth center). He recalls his first program being bugged with small mistakes like confusing I and 1 that kept it from running.

Sysoev graduated from high-school in 1987 and tried to join the MGTU im. Baumana (technical university) in Moscow, Russian Socialist Republic, but failed at the first attempt. Back home, he started working at the lab of the Institute of Teacher Education under the USSR Ministry of Geology. There he started coding in BASIC on old Iskra-2 PCs.

His first significant and distributable program was antivirus AV, created in 1989-1990, written entirely in assembly code that spanned 100 KB. It could search for several known viruses raging in the USSR at that time (Marijuana, Sophia, Vienna and other), was copied as a binary executable and gradually became popular, even being installed on production plants. Grateful users kept sending in more variants of viruses, that were enrolled into new versions, but by 1992 Igor had lost interest in updating it.

Graduating in 1994 he already had experience of system administration for a year for an oil company, and stayed with that company for almost 7 years. He spent half a year in the internet shop XXL.RU, joining Rambler, one of the leading Russian web portals, in November 13, 2000.

=== Rambler and Apache modules ===
There not only did he work as a system administrator, but also resumed coding in his spare time, adapting several Apache modules.

In fall of 2001 he conceived an idea to code a more lightweight and performant web server than Apache. With enough experience as an administrator and a coder, he made many principles of his program similar, while the code itself was original from the start. This work commenced around 2002.

=== nginx ===
The development of nginx started in 2002 after Igor had been administering the Rambler servers, which had been running Apache, for two years, but those lacked scaling capability beyond 1000 users on a single server. Increasing the number of servers could help, but initiated problems of its own, and Igor conceived an idea to do scaling inside a server, increasing the number of possible connections. At first the idea was driven by mere technical curiosity, until after about two years he was offered to try it on Zvuki.ru web library of music.

Among the first customers were Zvuki.ru, Estonia dating service Rate.ee and Russian dating service Mamba.ru. There were zero promotion efforts, as Igor didn't have the ability or desire to do that in addition.

He continued posting program updates on his own website, and the users picked up support for it with documentation and help. A user from Austria started translating it to English, which led to first English-speaking users in 2006.

In 2007 Igor was surprised to see the statistics at Netcraft, placing nginx at 4% of all web servers, with many customers residing in China.

Igor recalls the principal difference with the popular Apache server - the ability to work with multiple users in a single running process, saving memory and CPU resources.

With his aversion to marketing and sales, Igor wasn't seeking to start a commercial company, but first investors started approaching him, and in 2010 he had a meeting with Maxim Konovalov, the future co-founder of the company. Another factor that influenced the company's creation was Igor meetings with Serguei Beloussov, a Russian-born Singaporean IT entrepreneur and investor in December 2010. Serguei introduced Igor to the idea of "market momentum", with the momentum being quite right to start a commercial business.

=== Company foundation ===
The company had international ambitions right from the very beginning, both because it helped attract investments and because the product had a world appeal, while Russia's market was too small and not ready for the paid support model. The two owners had little knowledge of international sales procedures and didn't hope to gain the skills quickly enough. That prompted a goal of opening an American office and hiring an American director.

The company had been staying under the radar for some time, and customers were unaware of the commercial support option. Igor recalls finding his correspondence from 2011 naive, as it suggested the idea of selling technical support for an open source project. It was a popular trend of the time, but few could succeed with it.

By 2013 the company had yet no paying customers with its subscription service NGINX Plus, but was cooperating with Netflix, helping them build a network of CDN servers based on FreeBSD and nginx. The alliance was quickly able to speed each server up from 1 Gbit/s to 10 Gbit/s and then to 40 Gbit/s of traffic.

The same year the company had millions of users of the free version and more than 1500 customers paying for additional modules. Their marketing muscle amounted to zero, Igor recalls, which the company countered by hiring Gus Robertson, former vice-president of Red Hat, in 2013.

The company had 10–13 staff in 2013 and grew to 250 by 2019 in all 5 countries of presence (Russia, United States, Ireland, Singapore, Australia), of whom 70 were engineers, 33 employees were located in Moscow.
