= Mike Belshe =

American computer scientist

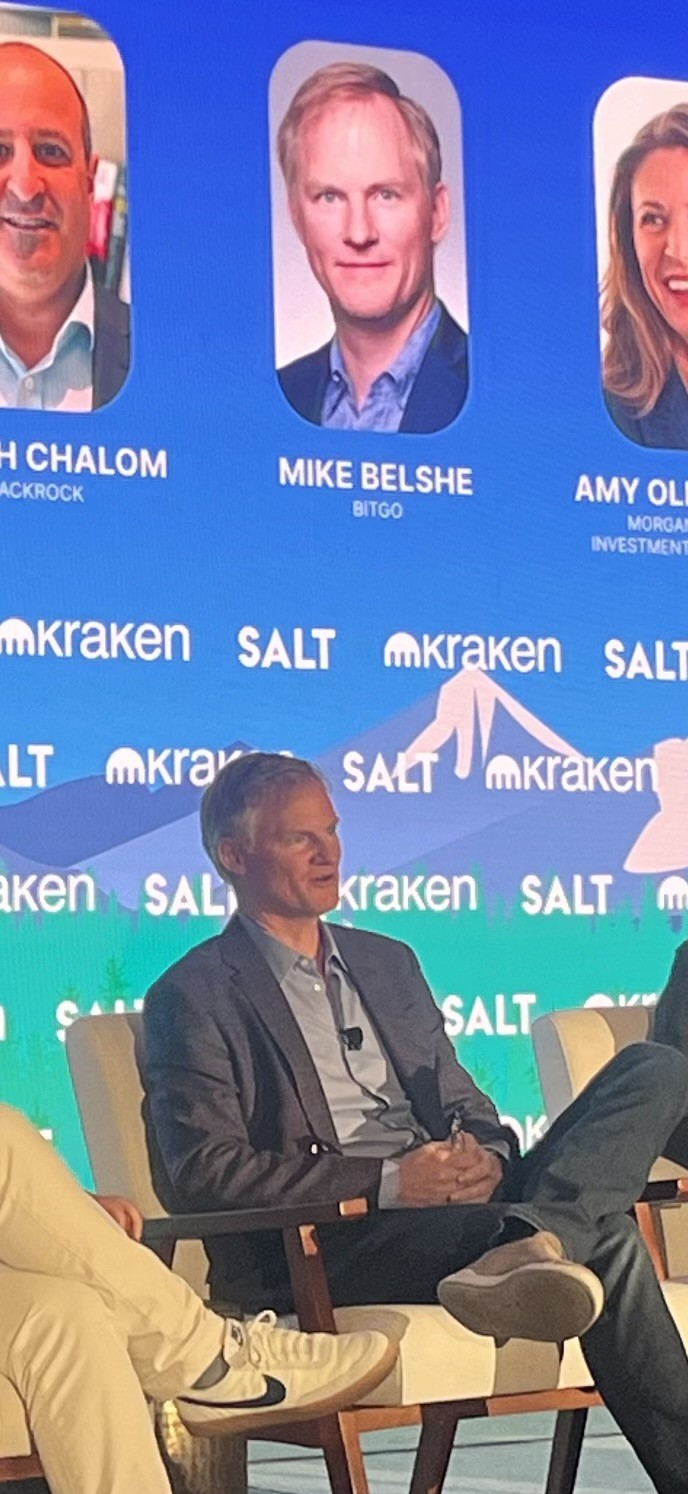
- Belshe in 2024
- Education: California Polytechnic State University, San Luis Obispo (BA)
- Occupation(s): CEO, BitGo
- Website: www.belshe.com

Mike Belshe (born 1971) is an American computer scientist and entrepreneur. He's a co-founder and CEO of BitGo, Inc. and a cofounder of Lookout Software in 2004. He is the co-inventor of the SPDY protocol and the lead author of the HTTP/2.0 specification.

== Early life and education ==
Belshe received his bachelor's degree in computer science from California Polytechnic State University, San Luis Obispo.

He is also an inventor with over 10 technology patents.

He is a lifelong Bay Area resident and grew up just outside of Berkeley.

== Career ==
Belshe started his career at Hewlett-Packard in 1993 as a software engineer focusing on systems and infrastructure.

In 1995 he joined Silicon Valley startup Netscape Communications Corp., where he worked on the enterprise-level use web server Netscape Enterprise Server. where he worked closely with Ben Horowitz as one of the critical engineers.

He later joined Supernews as VP of applications. He joined Good Technology before co-founding Lookout Software with Eric Hahn. Microsoft eventually acquired Lookout and it became a key feature of Outlook to quickly find information in email inboxes and file folders.

Joining Google in 2006, he was one the early hires working with Sundar Pichai on a project which two years later would become Google Chrome and was part of the Google Chrome Comic. As part of the Chrome team he worked on protocol research, and later co-authored the SPDY protocol. He submitted SPDY to the IETF in 2011, and was an author of HTTP/2.

As part of the IETF standardization effort, Belshe argued for encryption by default within the protocol. The encrypted-by-default approach was later adopted by all major browsers.

Belshe in 2013 went on to co-found BitGo, an infrastructure provider and financial services company for digital assets. He was quickly named CEO.

In March 2025, BitGo was appointed as the custodian for USD1, a stable coin launched by World Liberty Financial. BitGo in September 2025 filed for a US IPO, the first move of its kind.

== Politics ==
Mike has advocated for clear regulation within the Bitcoin and crypto industry. He firmly believes in allowing capitalism to thrive in emerging industries.

In March 2023, Belshe testified before the House Financial Services Subcommittee on Digital Assets, Financial Technology, and Inclusion. In his testimony, Belshe advocated for sensible regulation to keep pace with technological innovation in the digital asset space, arguing that regulatory exclusion harms investors and risks pushing the industry overseas while calling for Congress to establish a clear regulatory framework.

In the leadup to the 2024 Presidential election, he hosted JD Vance for a fundraiser in Palo Alto.
