= HTTP pipelining =

Computer communication technique

Time diagram of non-pipelined vs. pipelined connection

HTTP pipelining is a feature of HTTP/1.1 that allows multiple HTTP requests to be sent over a single TCP connection without waiting for the corresponding responses. HTTP/1.1 requires servers to respond to pipelined requests correctly, with non-pipelined but valid responses even if the server does not support HTTP pipelining. Despite this requirement, many legacy HTTP/1.1 servers do not support pipelining correctly, forcing most HTTP clients not to use HTTP pipelining.

The technique was superseded by multiplexing via HTTP/2, which is supported by most modern browsers.

In HTTP/3, multiplexing is accomplished via QUIC which replaces TCP. This further reduces loading time, as there is no head-of-line blocking even if some packets are lost.

== Motivation and limitations ==
The pipelining of requests results in a dramatic improvement in the loading times of HTML pages, especially over high latency connections such as satellite Internet connections. The speedup is less apparent on broadband connections, as the limitation of HTTP 1.1 still applies: the server must send its responses in the same order that the requests were received—so the entire connection remains first-in-first-out and HOL blocking can occur.

The asynchronous operations of HTTP/2 and SPDY are solution for this. By 2017 most browsers supported HTTP/2 by default which uses multiplexing instead.

Non-idempotent requests such as POST should not be pipelined. Read requests like GET and HEAD can always be pipelined. A sequence of other idempotent requests like PUT and DELETE can be pipelined or not depending on whether requests in the sequence depend on the effect of others.

HTTP pipelining requires both the client and the server to support it. HTTP/1.1 conforming servers are required to produce valid responses to pipelined requests, but may not actually process requests concurrently.

Most pipelining problems happen in HTTP intermediate nodes (hop-by-hop), i.e. in proxy servers, especially in transparent proxy servers (if one of them along the HTTP chain does not handle pipelined requests properly then nothing works as it should).

Using pipelining with HTTP proxy servers is usually not recommended also because the HOL blocking problem may really slow down proxy server responses (as the server responses must be in the same order of the received requests).

Example: if a client sends 4 pipelined GET requests to a proxy through a single connection and the first one is not in its cache then the proxy has to forward that request to the destination web server; if the following three requests are instead found in its cache, the proxy has to wait for the web server response, then it has to send it to the client and only then it can send the three cached responses too.

If instead a client opens 4 connections to a proxy and sends 1 GET request per connection (without using pipelining) the proxy can send the three cached responses to client in parallel before the response from server is received, decreasing the overall completion time (because requests are served in parallel with no head-of-line blocking problem). The same advantage exists in HTTP/2 multiplexed streams.

== Implementation status ==
Pipelining was introduced in HTTP/1.1 and was not present in HTTP/1.0.

=== Implementation in web browsers ===
Of all the major browsers, only Opera had a fully working implementation that was enabled by default. In other browsers HTTP pipelining was disabled or not implemented.

- Internet Explorer 8 does not support pipeline requests, due to concerns regarding buggy proxies and head-of-line blocking.
- Internet Explorer 11 does not support pipelining.
- Mozilla browsers (such as Mozilla Firefox, SeaMonkey and Camino) used to support pipelining; however, it was removed in Firefox 54. When it was supported, pipelining was disabled by default to avoid issues with misbehaving servers. If pipelining was enabled by the user, Mozilla browsers used some heuristics, mostly to turn pipelining off for older Microsoft IIS servers. The removal was eventually backported to SeaMonkey.
- Konqueror 2.0 supports pipelining, but it is disabled by default.
- Google Chrome previously supported pipelining, but it has been disabled due to bugs and problems with poorly behaving servers.
- Pale Moon (web browser) supports pipelining, and is enabled by default.

=== Implementation in web proxy servers ===
Most HTTP proxies do not pipeline outgoing requests.

Some HTTP proxies, including transparent HTTP proxies, may manage pipelined requests very badly (e.g. by mixing up the order of pipelined responses).

Some versions of the Squid web proxy will pipeline up to two outgoing requests. This functionality has been disabled by default and needs to be manually enabled for "bandwidth management and access logging reasons". Squid supports multiple requests from clients.

The Polipo proxy pipelines outgoing requests.

Tempesta FW, an open source application delivery controller, also pipelines requests to backend servers.

=== Other implementations ===
The libwww library made by the World Wide Web Consortium (W3C), supports pipelining since version 5.1 released at 18 February 1997.

Other application development libraries that support HTTP pipelining include:

- Perl modules providing client support for HTTP pipelining are HTTP::Async and the LWPng (libwww-perl New Generation) library.
- The Microsoft .NET Framework 3.5 supports HTTP pipelining in the module System.Net.HttpWebRequest.
- Qt class QNetworkRequest, introduced in 4.4.

Some other applications currently exploiting pipelining are:

- IceBreak application server since BUILD389
- phttpget from FreeBSD (a minimalist pipelined HTTP client)
- libcurl previously had limited support for pipelining using the CURLMOPT_PIPELINING option, but this support was removed in version 7.65.0
- portsnap (a FreeBSD ports tree distribution system)
- Advanced Packaging Tool (APT) supports pipelining.
- Subversion (SVN) has optional support for HTTP pipelining with the serf WebDAV access module (the default module, neon, does not have pipelining support).
- Microsoft Message Queuing on Windows Server 2003 utilises pipelining on HTTP by default, and can be configured to use it on HTTPS.
- IBM CICS 3.1 supports HTTP pipelining within its client.

Testing tools which support HTTP pipelining include:

- httperf
- Nmap supports pipelining requests with the Nmap Scripting Engine (NSE)

== See also ==
- HTTP persistent connection
- WebSocket
- SPDY
