= Google Web Server =

Web server used exclusively by Google

- Developer: Google
- Stable release: 2.1
- Written in: C++
- Operating system: Heavily modified version of Debian Linux
- License: Proprietary

Google Web Server (GWS) is proprietary web server software that Google uses for its web infrastructure. GWS is used exclusively inside Google's ecosystem for website hosting.

In 2008 GWS team was led by Bharat Mediratta. GWS is sometimes described as one of the most guarded components of Google's infrastructure.

In 2010 GWS was reported as serving 13% of all web sites in the world. In May, 2015, GWS was ranked as the fourth most popular web server on the internet after Apache, nginx and Microsoft IIS, powering an estimated 7.95% of active websites. Web page requests on most Google pages provide "gws" (without a version number) in the HTTP header as an indication of the web server software being used.

Information regarding GWS is scarce. In a blog post from Google's Chicago office in 2011, Google provided some details on GWS:

"The Google Web Server (GWS) team builds and improves the proprietary web-serving infrastructure that powers Google web search and many other Google search properties. GWS is involved in almost every user-visible change to the google.com site, meaning that there's frequently something to write home about. We're always looking for gung-ho engineers, ideally with a background in systems and experience working with very large C++ codebases."
