= Httperf =

In computing httperf (pronounced h-t-t-perf) is a testing tool to measure the performance of web servers. It was originally developed by David Mosberger and other staff at Hewlett-Packard Research Laboratories.

httperf can test HTTP pipelining workloads.

== Bibliography ==
- Webの負荷テストに使えるフリーソフトウェア, ITmedia
- D. Mosberger and T. Jin. httperf: A Tool for Measuring Web Server Performance . Performance Evaluation Review, Volume 26, Number 3, December 1998, 31-37. (Originally appeared in Proceedings of the 1998 Internet Server Performance Workshop, June 1998, 59-67.)
