= Transactions per second =

Measure of how many transactions a system can process per second

In a very generic sense, the term transactions per second (TPS) refers to the number of atomic actions performed by certain entity per second. In a more restricted view, the term is usually used by the DBMS vendor and user community to refer to the number of database transactions performed per second. Transactions per minute may be used when the transactions are more complex.

Recently, the term has also been used to describe the transaction rate of a cryptocurrency, such as the distributed network running the Bitcoin blockchain. The development of transaction rates capable of scaling to real-world volumes is an important area of research for cryptocurrency technology.

== See also ==
- Queries per second
