= BitGo =

Security company in California

BitGo Holdings, Inc.
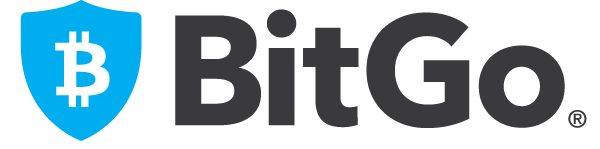
- Type: Public
- Traded as: NYSE: BTGO
- Founded: 2011; 15 years ago
- Founder: Mike Belshe; Ben Davenport; Will O'Brien; Bill Lee
- Headquarters: Sioux Falls, South Dakota
- Key people: Mike Belshe (CEO)
- Services: Bitcoin; blockchain security platform APIs; custodial services; settlement services
- Revenue: ▲US$16.152 billion (2025)
- Net income: ▼ -US$14.782 million (2025)
- Total assets: ▲US$4.548 billion (2025)
- Total equity: ▼US$318.6 million (2025)
- Owner: Mike Belshe (11 million shares); Valor Equity Partners (12.5 million shares); Redpoint Ventures (10.7 million shares); Craft Ventures (7.5 million shares)
- Number of employees: 566 (2026)
- Website: www.bitgo.com

BitGo Holdings, Inc. is a digital asset infrastructure and financial services company headquartered in Sioux Falls, South Dakota.

BitGo secures approximately 20% of all on-chain Bitcoin transactions by value and is the largest independent digital asset custodian, with over $100 billion in digital assets on its platform. BitGo is a Fortune 500 company ranked 273rd in 2026.

The company offers a multisignature bitcoin wallet service, where keys are divided among several owners to manage risk. Generally, BitGo wallets have three keys: one held by BitGo, and two held by the wallet's owner. Wallets can be configured in both hot and cold configurations, as well as non-custodial and custodial configurations.

BitGo serves as the sole custodian for bitcoin that people deposit to receive a tokenized form of that bitcoin known as Wrapped Bitcoin (WBTC) that can be exchanged on the Ethereum blockchain. BitGo is the custodian for USD1, a stablecoin issued by World Liberty Financial, a company with ties to Donald Trump. It is also the custodian for frxUSD, a fractional reserve stablecoin. BitGo issues SoFiUSD, a stablecoin issued by SoFi Bank.

As of March 31, 2026, the company owned 2,449 Bitcoins for its own account; changes to the value of such Bitcoins are reported as income or loss on the company's financial statements.

== History ==
BitGo was founded by Mike Belshe, Ben Davenport, Will O'Brien, and Bill Lee. BitGo, Inc. was incorporated in Delaware in 2011 under the name "Whensoon, Inc.". The name was changed to "Twist and Shout, Inc." later in 2011. It was renamed "BitGo, Inc." in 2014.

=== Early growth and development (2014–2017) ===
In June 2014, the company raised $12 million in a Series A round led by Redpoint Ventures with participation from several early investors in Tesla and SpaceX. These included Bill Lee, a founding board member of SpaceX and early backer of Tesla, and Antonio Gracias through his firm, Valor Equity Partners. Shares were sold for $0.59 each.

In February 2015, the company bought an insurance policy from XL Catlin against theft from its wallets.

In December 2017, BitGo raised a $42.5 million Series B funding round led by Valor Equity Partners; its founder, Antonio Gracias joined BitGo's board of directors. David O. Sacks also invested both personally and through his venture capital firm, Craft Ventures. Shares were sold in this round for $2.53 each.

=== Custody expansion (2016–2018) ===
In September 2018, BitGo was approved by the South Dakota Division of Banking to act as a qualified custodian for digital assets.

In October 2018, the company raised $15 million in addition to its Series B round from Goldman Sachs and Michael Novogratz's Galaxy Digital. Shares were sold in this round for $3.54 each.

=== Regulatory milestones (2020–present) ===
In December 2020, BitGo agreed to pay $98,830 to the U.S. Department of the Treasury to settle its potential civil liability for 183 apparent violations of sanctions programs related to Ukraine, Cuba, Iran, Sudan, and Syria between 2015 and 2019.

In March 2021, BitGo received a NY Trust Charter from the New York State Department of Financial Services.

In May 2021, Galaxy Digital announced the planned acquisition of BitGo for $1.2 billion in cash and stock, marking the first $1 billion deal in the cryptocurrency industry. In August 2022, Galaxy terminated the deal, alleging BitGo's inability to provide certain financial statements needed by Galaxy for its SEC filing. BitGo said that it had provided its audited financials and honored its obligations, and that it would legally seek the $100 million termination fee provided for in the documents. In June 2023, the Delaware Chancery Court dismissed BitGo’s suit, saying Galaxy had a "valid basis" to terminate the deal. On appeal, the Delaware Supreme Court reversed the decision of the Court of Chancery. The case was headed to trial as of late 2025.

In June 2023, BitGo signed a letter of intent to acquire Prime Core Technologies, the Nevada-based parent company of digital asset custodian Prime Trust. BitGo terminated the acquisition two weeks later, alleging that Prime Core did not have the finances to complete the deal.

In August 2023, BitGo raised $100 million from new investors in Series C funding at a $1.75 billion valuation. Shares were sold in this round at $16.05 each.

In December 2024, the company launched a retail platform.

In December 2025, BitGo received regulatory approval from the Office of the Comptroller of the Currency to become a federally chartered cryptocurrency bank. The approval was opposed by the Bank Policy Institute, which said it would "significantly increase risks to the U.S. financial system" and "create an unlevel playing field that would harm traditional federal- and state-chartered banks".

In January 2026, BitGo became the first Digital Asset Infrastructure company to become a New York Stock Exchange (NYSE) listed public company via an initial public offering; the company raised $212 million. That month, the company moved its headquarters from California to Sioux Falls, South Dakota.
