= Queries per second =

Measure of search traffic an information retrieval system receives

Queries per second (QPS) is a measure of the amount of search traffic an information-retrieval system, such as a search engine or a database, receives in one second. The term is used more broadly for any request–response system, where it can more correctly be called requests per second (RPS).

High-traffic systems must be mindful of QPS to know when to scale to handle greater load.

== See also ==
- Transactions per second
