= LiteSpeed Web Server =

Proprietary web server software

- Original author: George Wang
- Developer: LiteSpeed Technologies
- Release: 1 July 2003; 23 years ago
- Stable release: 6.3.5 / 14 March 2026; 6 months ago
- Written in: C, C++
- Operating system: CloudLinux OS, AlmaLinux/Centos/Red Hat/Fedora, Debian/Ubuntu, FreeBSD
- Type: Web server
- License: Non-free proprietary or GPL3
- Website: www.litespeedtech.com/products/litespeed-web-server

LiteSpeed Web Server (LSWS) is proprietary web server software. It is the 4th most popular web server, estimated to be used by 13.9% of websites as of September 2024. LSWS is developed by privately held LiteSpeed Technologies. The software uses the same configuration format as Apache HTTP Server and is compatible with most Apache features. An open source variant is also available.

LSWS was released in 2003, and in August 2008 it became the 16th most popular web server. In November 2016, LiteSpeed's market share grew from 0.39% to 3.29%, increasing its position from 10th to 4th most popular web server according to Netcraft. In 2017, a team from Hong Kong Polytechnic University found it to be one of the six most popular web servers, and it was estimated by a team at RWTH Aachen University to be running 9.2% of all HTTP/2-enabled websites. As of September 2024, LSWS was used by 36.3% of websites using HTTP/3.

According to a Netcraft web server survey, LiteSpeed had 6% of global market share of active sites as of September 2024.

LiteSpeed Cache, a cache and performance module also known as LSCache, is built into LiteSpeed Web Server. LSCache can be managed via rewrite rules, or via plugins developed specifically for particular content management systems, including WordPress.

== Features ==
LSWS is compatible with commonly used Apache features, including mod_rewrite, .htaccess, and mod_security. LSWS can load Apache configuration files directly and works as a drop-in replacement for Apache while fully integrating with popular control panels. LSWS replaces all Apache functions, but uses an event driven approach to handle requests.

== History ==
LiteSpeed Technologies was founded in early 2002 by a team of engineers led by George Wang. On July 1, 2003, LiteSpeed Web Server was officially released as a full-featured web server. In 2007, LiteSpeed Web Server became LiteSpeed Web Server Enterprise and was configured to be an Apache drop-in replacement. In that same year, the web server integrated with cPanel, DirectAdmin, and Plesk. LiteSpeed Web Server officially began supporting HTTP/2 in 2015 with version 5.0, and also released LSCache (cache plugin for WordPress) with ESI in version 5.0.10. In 2017, LSWS released QUIC support. In July 2019, LSWS announced support for HTTP/3.

== See also ==
- Comparison of web server software
