= Zeus Web Server =

Web server program

Zeus Web Server is a discontinued proprietary high-performance web server for Unix and Unix-like platforms (including Solaris, FreeBSD, HP-UX and Linux). It was developed by Zeus Technology, a software company located in Cambridge, England that was founded in 1995 by University of Cambridge graduates Damian Reeves and Adam Twiss.

== History ==
Zeus was designed to be a high-performance web server since the beginning of its development in 1995. Until the first decade of the 2000s, it was known as one of the fastest and most scalable web servers available on market.

Despite its excellent performance, it never gained more than a few percentage points (less than 3%) in the global usage of most popular web servers. However, it was commonly used by hardware vendors submitting SPECweb99 benchmarks for their hardware. The SPECweb99 benchmark was retired in 2005 and replaced by SPECweb2005. While some SPECweb2005 submissions were made using Zeus, by 2008 it was no longer used by the top computer hardware performers.

Support for AIX, Tru64, and Mac OS X was dropped on 10 June 2008. No new Zeus releases have been made since January 2010, and the company no longer offers a similar server solution. In July 2011, the company was acquired by Riverbed Technology, who ended support for Zeus on November 30, 2014.

== Features ==
In addition to static content serving, Zeus supported dynamic content via CGI, FastCGI, Apache JServ, ISAPI, NSAPI, mod_perl, SSI and Zeus Distributed Authentication and Content (ZDAC), a proprietary FastCGI-like protocol. While Zeus mainly competed with other commercial web servers such as Oracle iPlanet Web Server, it also included a high degree of compatibility with Apache HTTP Server (including .htaccess support and a URL rewriting system comparable to Apache's mod_rewrite), with the expectation that Apache users would migrate to Zeus as their server load increased. NSAPI and ISAPI were added to ease migrations from Microsoft IIS and Sun Java System Web Server.

== See also ==
- Comparison of web server software
- ApacheBench program derived from original ZeusBench used to benchmark performance of Zeus Web Server.
