= Cherokee (web server) =

Open source web server software application

Cherokee Web Server

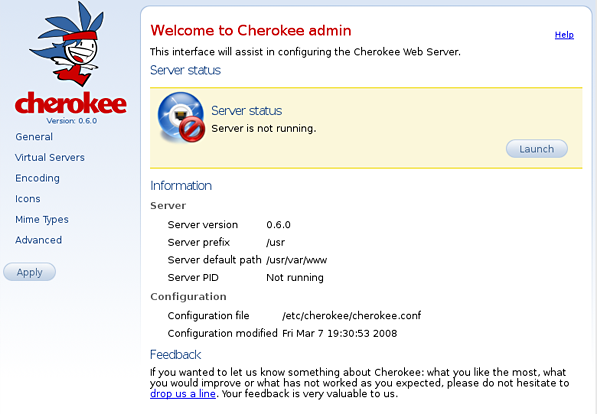
- Original authors: Álvaro López Ortega, Cherokee Project
- Stable release: 1.2.104 / 1 April 2014; 12 years ago
- Written in: C, Python and JavaScript
- Operating system: Cross-platform
- Available in: English, Spanish, German, French, Italian, Dutch, Polish, Swedish, Brazilian Portuguese, Chinese Simplified, Catalan, Galician
- Type: Web server
- License: GPLv2
- Website: cherokee-project.com
- Repository: github.com/cherokee/webserver

Cherokee is an open-source, cross-platform, web server that runs on Linux, BSD variants, Solaris, OS X, and Windows. It is a lightweight, high-performance web server/reverse proxy licensed under the GNU General Public License. Its goal is to be fast and fully functional yet still light. Major features of Cherokee include a graphical administration interface named cherokee-admin, and a modular light-weight design.

Cherokee is maintained and developed by an open source community.

== Features ==
=== Web server features ===
- TLS and SSL
- Virtual servers
- URL rewriting and redirections supporting regular expressions
- Authentication via htdigest, htpasswd, LDAP, MySQL, PAM, plain, and fixed list.
- Reverse HTTP proxy
- HTTP load balancing
- Traffic shaping
- Custom and Apache compatible log format.
- Ability to launch web applications on demand
- Audio/video streaming
- On the fly gzip and deflate compressions
- Resilient to the 10000 simultaneous connections barrier
- Server Side Includes (SSI)
- CGI
- FastCGI
- SCGI
- uWSGI support
- chroot support
- RRDtool statistics
- Database bridging and sharding (DBSlayer-like)
- Graphical configuration interface
- Point & click deployments through an application market

=== Web applications ===
Configuration wizards are provided to automatically configure the web server to perform specific tasks, or run frameworks and applications. These provide support for: PHP through FastCGI, Ruby on Rails, ColdFusion, GlassFish, Django, Alfresco, GNU Mailman, .NET with Mono, rTorrent, Symfony, and Zend Engine, plus generic Video Streaming and uWSGI.

== Devices running Cherokee ==
During the last few years Cherokee has been adopted by numerous electronic device makes and IoT technology manufacturers. Some examples include GoPro action cameras and drones, Xiaomi action cameras, Digi International's Internet of things kits, ATN Corporation's high-end rifle scopes, and Defender's security cameras. Since Cherokee is Open Source Software and does not require manufacturers to license the code, there is no way to know how many companies are embedding Cherokee in their products.

== See also ==
- Comparison of web servers
- Traffic Server
- Web accelerator which discusses host-based HTTP acceleration
- Proxy server which discusses client-side proxies
- Reverse proxy which discusses origin-side proxies
