= URL redirection =

Technique for making a Web page available under more than one URL address

URL redirection, also called URL forwarding, is an Internet technique for making a web page available under more than one URL address. When a web browser attempts to open a URL that has been redirected, a page with a different URL is opened. Similarly, domain redirection or domain forwarding is when all pages in a URL domain are redirected to a different domain, as when wikipedia.com and wikipedia.net are automatically redirected to wikipedia.org.

URL redirection is done for various reasons:

- for URL shortening;
- to prevent broken links when web pages are moved;
- to allow multiple domain names belonging to the same owner to refer to a single web site;
- to guide navigation into and out of a website;
- for privacy protection (such as redirecting YouTube and Twitter links to Invidious and Nitter respectively or to turn AMP links into normal links); and
- for hostile purposes such as phishing attacks or malware distribution.

== Purposes ==
There are several reasons to use URL redirection:

=== Forcing HTTPS ===
A website may potentially be accessible over both a secure HTTPS URI scheme and plain HTTP (an insecure URI beginning with "http://").

If a user types in a URI or clicks on a link that refers to the insecure variant, the browser will automatically redirect to the secure version in case the website is contained in the HSTS preload list shipped with the application or if the user had already visited the origin in the past.

Otherwise the website will be contacted over HTTP. A website operator may decide to serve such requests by redirecting the browser to the HTTPS variant instead and hopefully also priming HSTS for future accesses.

=== Similar domain names ===
A user might mistype a URL. Organizations often register these misspelled domains and redirect them to the intended location. This technique is often used to "reserve" other top-level domains (TLD) with the same name, or make it easier for a ".edu" or ".net" site to accommodate users who type ".com".

=== Moving pages to a new domain ===
Web pages may be redirected to a new domain for three reasons:

- a site might desire, or need, to change its domain name;
- an author might move their individual pages to a new domain;
- two web sites might merge.

With URL redirects, incoming links to an outdated URL can be sent to the correct location. These links might be from other sites that have not realized that there is a change or from bookmarks/favorites that users have saved in their browsers. The same applies to search engines. They often have the older/outdated domain names and links in their database and will send search users to these old URLs. By using a "moved permanently" redirect to the new URL, visitors will still end up at the correct page. Also, in the next search engine pass, the search engine should detect and use the newer URL.

=== Logging outgoing links ===
The access logs of most web servers keep detailed information about where visitors came from and how they browsed the hosted site. They do not, however, log which links visitors left by. This is because the visitor's browser has no need to communicate with the original server when the visitor clicks on an outgoing link. This information can be captured in several ways. One way involves URL redirection. Instead of sending the visitor straight to the other site, links on the site can direct to a URL on the original website's domain that automatically redirects to the real target. This technique bears the downside of the delay caused by the additional request to the original website's server. As this added request will leave a trace in the server log, revealing exactly which link was followed, it can also be a privacy issue. The same technique is also used by some corporate websites to implement a statement that the subsequent content is at another site, and therefore not necessarily affiliated with the corporation. In such scenarios, displaying the warning causes an additional delay.

=== Short aliases for long URLs ===
Web applications often include lengthy descriptive attributes in their URLs which represent data hierarchies, command structures, transaction paths and session information. This practice results in a URL that is aesthetically unpleasant and difficult to remember, and which may not fit within the size limitations of microblogging sites. URL shortening services provide a solution to this problem by redirecting a user to a longer URL from a shorter one.

=== Meaningful, persistent aliases for long or changing URLs ===
Sometimes the URL of a page changes even though the content stays the same. Therefore, URL redirection can help users who have bookmarks. This is routinely done on Wikipedia whenever a page is renamed.

=== Post/Redirect/Get ===
Post/Redirect/Get (PRG) is a web development design pattern that prevents some duplicate form submissions if the user clicks the refresh button after submitting the form, creating a more intuitive interface for user agents (users).

=== Device targeting and geotargeting ===
Redirects can be effectively used for targeting purposes like geotargeting. Device targeting has become increasingly important with the rise of mobile clients. There are two approaches to serve mobile users: Make the website responsive or redirect to a mobile website version. If a mobile website version is offered, users with mobile clients will be automatically forwarded to the corresponding mobile content. For device targeting, client-side redirects or non-cacheable server-side redirects are used. Geotargeting is the approach to offer localized content and automatically forward the user to a localized version of the requested URL. This is helpful for websites that target audience in more than one location and/or language. Usually server-side redirects are used for Geotargeting but client-side redirects might be an option as well, depending on requirements.

=== Manipulating search engines ===
Redirects have been used to manipulate search engines with unethical intentions, e.g., URL hijacking. The goal of misleading redirects is to drive search traffic to landing pages, which do not have enough ranking power on their own or which are only remotely or not at all related to the search target. The approach requires a rank for a range of search terms with a number of URLs that would utilize sneaky redirects to forward the searcher to the target page. This method had a revival with the uprise of mobile devices and device targeting. URL hijacking is an off-domain redirect technique that exploited the nature of the search engine's handling for temporary redirects. If a temporary redirect is encountered, search engines have to decide whether they assign the ranking value to the URL that initializes the redirect or to the redirect target URL. The URL that initiates the redirect may be kept to show up in search results, as the redirect indicates a temporary nature. Under certain circumstances it was possible to exploit this behavior by applying temporary redirects to well-ranking URLs, leading to a replacement of the original URL in search results by the URL that initialized the redirect, therefore "stealing" the ranking. This method was usually combined with sneaky redirects to re-target the user stream from the search results to a target page. Search engines have developed efficient technologies to detect these kinds of manipulative approaches. Major search engines usually apply harsh ranking penalties on sites that get caught applying techniques like these.

=== Manipulating visitors ===
URL redirection is sometimes used as a part of phishing attacks that confuse visitors about which web site they are visiting. Because modern browsers always show the real URL in the address bar, the threat is lessened. However, redirects can also take you to sites that will otherwise attempt to attack in other ways. For example, a redirect might take a user to a site that would attempt to trick them into downloading antivirus software and installing a Trojan of some sort instead.

=== Removing referrer information ===
When a link is clicked, the browser sends along in the HTTP request a field called referer which indicates the source of the link. This field is populated with the URL of the current web page, and will end up in the logs of the server serving the external link. Since sensitive pages may have sensitive URLs (for example, https://company.com/plans-for-the-next-release-of-our-product), it is not desirable for the referrer URL to leave the organization. A redirection page that performs referrer hiding could be embedded in all external URLs, transforming for example https://externalsite.com/page into https://redirect.company.com/https://externalsite.com/page. This technique also eliminates other potentially sensitive information from the referrer URL, such as the session ID, and can reduce the chance of phishing by indicating to the end user that they passed a clear gateway to another site.

== Implementation ==
Several different kinds of response to the browser will result in a redirection. These vary in whether they affect HTTP headers or HTML content. The techniques used typically depend on the role of the person implementing it and their access to different parts of the system. For example, a web author with no control over the headers might use a Refresh meta tag whereas a web server administrator redirecting all pages on a site is more likely to use server configuration.

=== Manual redirect ===
The simplest technique is to ask the visitor to follow a link to the new page, usually using an HTML anchor like:

Please follow <a href="https://www.example.com/">this link</a>.

This method is often used as a fall-back — if the browser does not support the automatic redirect, the visitor can still reach the target document by following the link.

=== HTTP status codes 3xx ===
In the HTTP protocol used by the World Wide Web, a redirect is a response with a status code beginning with 3 that causes a browser to display a different page. If a client encounters a redirect, it needs to make a number of decisions how to handle the redirect. Different status codes are used by clients to understand the purpose of the redirect, how to handle caching and which request method to use for the subsequent request.

HTTP/1.1 defines several status codes for redirection (RFC 7231):

- 300 multiple choices (e.g. offer different languages)
- 301 moved permanently (redirects permanently from one URL to another passing link equity to the redirected page)
- 302 found (originally "temporary redirect" in HTTP/1.0 and popularly used for CGI scripts; superseded by 303 and 307 in HTTP/1.1 but preserved for backward compatibility)
- 303 see other (forces a GET request to the new URL even if original request was POST)
- 305 use proxy (indicates that the client's requested resource is only available through a proxy)
- 307 temporary redirect (provides a new URL for the browser to resubmit a GET or POST request)
- 308 permanent redirect (provides a new URL for the browser to resubmit a GET or POST request)

Status codes 304 not modified and 305 use proxy are not redirects.

Redirect status codes and characteristics
HTTP Status Code	HTTP Version	Temporary / Permanent	Cacheable	Request Method Subsequent Request
301	HTTP/1.0	Permanent	Yes	GET / POST may change
302	HTTP/1.0	Temporary	not by default	GET / POST may change
303	HTTP/1.1	Temporary	never	always GET
307	HTTP/1.1	Temporary	not by default	may not change
308	HTTP/1.1	Permanent	by default	may not change

All of these status codes require the URL of the redirect target to be given in the "Location:" header of the HTTP response. The 300 multiple choices will usually list all choices in the body of the message and show the default choice in the "Location:" header.

==== Example HTTP response for a 301 redirect ====
A HTTP response with the 301 "moved permanently" redirect looks like this:

HTTP/1.1 301 Moved Permanently
Location: https://www.example.org/
Content-Type: text/html
Content-Length: 174

<html>
<head>
<title>Moved</title>
</head>
<body>
=Moved=
<p>This page has moved to <a href="https://www.example.org/">https://www.example.org/</a>.</p>
</body>
</html>

==== Using server-side scripting for redirection ====
Web authors producing HTML content can't usually create redirects using HTTP headers as these are generated automatically by the web server program when serving an HTML file. The same is usually true even for programmers writing CGI scripts, though some servers allow scripts to add custom headers (e.g. by enabling "non-parsed-headers"). Many web servers will generate a 3xx status code if a script outputs a "Location:" header line. For example, in PHP, one can use the "header" function:

header('HTTP/1.1 301 Moved Permanently');
header('Location: https://www.example.com/');
exit();

More headers may be required to prevent caching. The programmer must ensure that the headers are output before the body. This may not fit easily with the natural flow of control through the code. To help with this, some frameworks for server-side content generation can buffer the body data. In the ASP scripting language, this can also be accomplished using response.buffer=true and response.redirect "https://www.example.com/" HTTP/1.1 allows for either a relative URI reference or an absolute URI reference. If the URI reference is relative the client computes the required absolute URI reference according to the rules defined in RFC 3986.

==== Apache HTTP Server mod_rewrite ====
The Apache HTTP Server mod_alias extension can be used to redirect certain requests. Typical configuration directives look like:

Redirect permanent /oldpage.html https://www.example.com/newpage.html
Redirect 301 /oldpage.html https://www.example.com/newpage.html

For more flexible URL rewriting and redirection, Apache mod_rewrite can be used. E.g., to redirect a requests to a canonical domain name:

RewriteEngine on
RewriteCond %{HTTP_HOST} ^([^.:]+\.)*oldsite\.example\.com\.?(:[0-9]*)?$ [NC]
RewriteRule ^(.*)$ https://newsite.example.net/$1 [R=301,L]

Such configuration can be applied to one or all sites on the server through the server configuration files or to a single content directory through a .htaccess file.

==== nginx rewrite ====
Nginx has an integrated http rewrite module, which can be used to perform advanced URL processing and even web-page generation (with the return directive). An example of such advanced use of the rewrite module is mdoc.su, which implements a deterministic URL shortening service entirely with the help of nginx configuration language alone.

For example, if a request for /DragonFlyBSD/HAMMER.5 were to come along, it would first be redirected internally to /d/HAMMER.5 with the first rewrite directive below (only affecting the internal state, without any HTTP replies issued to the client just yet), and then with the second rewrite directive, an HTTP response with a 302 Found status code would be issued to the client to actually redirect to the external cgi script of web-man:

 location /DragonFly {
  rewrite ^/DragonFly(BSD)?([,/].*)?$ /d$2 last;
 }
 location /d {
  set $db "https://leaf.dragonflybsd.org/cgi/web-man?command=";
  set $ds "&section=";
  rewrite ^/./([^/]+)\.([1-9])$  $db$1$ds$2 redirect;
 }

=== Refresh Meta tag and HTTP refresh header ===
Netscape introduced the meta refresh feature which refreshes a page after a certain amount of time. This can specify a new URL to replace one page with another. This is supported by most web browsers. A timeout of zero seconds effects an immediate redirect. This is treated like a 301 permanent redirect by Google, allowing transfer of PageRank to the target page.

This is an example of a simple HTML document that uses this technique:

<html>
<head>
  <meta http-equiv="Refresh" content="0; url=https://www.example.com/" />
</head>
<body>
  <p>Please follow <a href="https://www.example.com/">this link</a>.</p>
</body>
</html>

This technique can be used by web authors because the meta tag is contained inside the document itself. The meta tag must be placed in the "head" section of the HTML file. The number "0" in this example may be replaced by another number to achieve a delay of that many seconds. The anchor in the "body" section is for users whose browsers do not support this feature.

The same effect can be achieved with an HTTP refresh header:

HTTP/1.1 200 OK
Refresh: 0; url=https://www.example.com/
Content-Type: text/html
Content-Length: 78

Please follow <a href="https://www.example.com/">this link</a>.

This response is easier to generate by CGI programs because one does not need to change the default status code.

Here is a simple CGI program that effects this redirect:

# !/usr/bin/env perl
print "Refresh: 0; url=https://www.example.com/\r\n";
print "Content-Type: text/html\r\n";
print "\r\n";
print "Please follow <a href=\"https://www.example.com/\">this link</a>!"

Note: Usually, the HTTP server adds the status line and the Content-Length header automatically.

The W3C discourage the use of meta refresh, since it does not communicate any information about either the original or new resource, to the browser (or search engine). The W3C's Web Content Accessibility Guidelines (7.4) discourage the creation of auto-refreshing pages, since most web browsers do not allow the user to disable or control the refresh rate. Some articles that they have written on the issue include W3C Web Content Accessibility Guidelines (1.0): Ensure user control of time-sensitive content changes, Use standard redirects: don't break the back button! and Core Techniques for Web Content Accessibility Guidelines 1.0 section 7.

=== JavaScript redirects ===
JavaScript can cause a redirect by setting the window.location attribute, e.g.:

window.location='https://www.example.com/'

Normally JavaScript pushes the redirector site's URL to the browser's history. It can cause redirect loops when users hit the back button. With the following command you can prevent this type of behaviour.

window.location.replace('https://www.example.com/')

However, HTTP headers or the refresh meta tag may be preferred for security reasons and because JavaScript will not be executed by some browsers and many web crawlers.

=== Frame redirects ===
A slightly different effect can be achieved by creating an inline frame:

<iframe height="100%" width="100%" src="https://www.example.com/">
Please follow <a href="https://www.example.com/">link</a>.
</iframe>

One main difference to the above redirect methods is that for a frame redirect, the browser displays the URL of the frame document and not the URL of the target page in the URL bar. This cloaking technique may be used so that the reader sees a more memorable URL or to fraudulently conceal a phishing site as part of website spoofing.

Before HTML5, the same effect could be done with an HTML frame that contains the target page:

<frameset rows="100%">
  <frame src="https://www.example.com/">
  <noframes>
    <body>Please follow <a href="https://www.example.com/">link</a>.</body>
  </noframes>
</frameset>

=== Redirect chains ===
One redirect may lead to another in a redirect chain. If a redirect leads to another redirect, this may also be known as a double redirect. This is unavoidable if the different links in the chain are served by different servers though it should be minimised by rewriting the URL as much as possible on the server before returning it to the browser as a redirect.

=== Redirect loops ===
Sometimes a mistake can cause a page to end up redirecting back to itself, possibly via other pages, leading to an infinite sequence of redirects. Browsers should stop redirecting after a certain number of hops and display an error message.

The HTTP/1.1 Standard states:

A client SHOULD detect and intervene in cyclical redirections (i.e., "infinite" redirection loops).

Note: An earlier version of this specification recommended a maximum of five redirections (RFC 2068, Section 10.3). Content developers need to be aware that some clients might implement such a fixed limitation.

== Services ==
There exist services that can perform URL redirection on demand, with no need for technical work or access to the web server your site is hosted on.

=== URL redirection services ===
A redirect service is an information management system, which provides an internet link that redirects users to the desired content. The typical benefit to the user is the use of a memorable domain name, and a reduction in the length of the URL or web address. A redirecting link can also be used as a permanent address for content that frequently changes hosts, similarly to the Domain Name System. Hyperlinks involving URL redirection services are frequently used in spam messages directed at blogs and wikis. Thus, one way to reduce spam is to reject all edits and comments containing hyperlinks to known URL redirection services; however, this will also remove legitimate edits and comments and may not be an effective method to reduce spam. Recently, URL redirection services have taken to using AJAX as an efficient, user friendly method for creating shortened URLs. A major drawback of some URL redirection services is the use of delay pages, or frame based advertising, to generate revenue.

==== History ====
The first redirect services took advantage of top-level domains (TLD) such as ".to" (Tonga), ".at" (Austria) and ".is" (Iceland). Their goal was to make memorable URLs. The first mainstream redirect service was V3.com that boasted 4 million users at its peak in 2000. V3.com success was attributed to having a wide variety of short memorable domains including "r.im", "go.to", "i.am", "come.to" and "start.at". V3.com was acquired by FortuneCity.com, a large free web hosting company, in early 1999. As the sales price of top level domains started falling from $50.00 per year to less than $10.00, use of redirection services declined. With the launch of TinyURL in 2002 a new kind of redirecting service was born, namely URL shortening. Their goal was to make long URLs short, to be able to post them on internet forums. Since 2006, with the 140 character limit on the extremely popular Twitter service, these short URL services have been heavily used.

=== Referrer masking ===
Redirection services can hide the referrer by placing an intermediate page between the page the link is on and its destination. Although these are conceptually similar to other URL redirection services, they serve a different purpose, and they rarely attempt to shorten or obfuscate the destination URL (as their only intended side-effect is to hide referrer information and provide a clear gateway between other websites.) This type of redirection is often used to prevent potentially-malicious links from gaining information using the referrer, for example a session ID in the query string. Many large community websites use link redirection on external links to lessen the chance of an exploit that could be used to steal account information, as well as make it clear when a user is leaving a service, to lessen the chance of effective phishing.

Here is a simplistic example of such a service, written in PHP.

<?php
$url = htmlspecialchars($_GET['url']);
header('Refresh: 0; url=https://' . $url);
?>
<!-- Fallback using meta refresh. -->
<html>
 <head>
  <title>Redirecting...</title>
  <meta http-equiv="refresh" content="0;url=https://<?= $url; ?>">
 </head>
 <body>
 Attempting to redirect to <a href="https://<?= $url; ?>">https://<?= $url; ?></a>.
 </body>
</html>

The above example does not check who called it (e.g. by referrer, although that could be spoofed). Also, it does not check the URL provided. This means that a malicious person could link to the redirection page using a URL parameter of his/her own selection, from any page, which uses the web server's resources.

== Security issues ==
URL redirection can be abused by attackers to perform phishing attacks. If a redirect target is not sufficiently validated by a web application, an attacker can make a web application redirect to an arbitrary website. This vulnerability is known as an open-redirect vulnerability. In certain cases when an open redirect occurs as part of an authentication flow, the vulnerability is known as a covert redirect. When a covert redirect occurs, the attacker website can steal authentication information from the victim website. Open redirect vulnerabilities are fairly common on the web. In June 2022, TechRadar found over 25 active examples of open redirect vulnerabilities on the web, including sites like Google and Instagram. Open redirects have their own CWE identifier, CWE-601.

URL redirection also provides a mechanism to perform cross-site leak attacks. By timing how long a website took to return a particular page or by differentiating one destination page from another, an attacker can gain significant information about another website's state. In 2021, Knittel et al. discovered a vulnerability in the Chrome's Performance API implementation which allowed them to reliably detect cross-origin redirects.

== See also ==
- Canonical link element
- Clean URL
- Domain masking
- HTTP location
- Link rot
- URI normalization
