= Invidious =

Alternative YouTube frontend

- Original author: Omar Roth
- Developers: Samantaz Fox, unixfox, Alex Maras, syeopite, Fijxu
- Release: August 13, 2018; 8 years ago
- Stable release: 2.20261022.0 / 23 October 2026; 24 days ago
- Written in: Crystal, HTML, JavaScript
- Type: Frontend
- License: AGPLv3
- Website: invidious.io
- Repository: Mirror from GitHub: gitea.invidious.io/iv-org/invidious, GitHub: github.com/iv-org/invidious

Invidious is a free and open-source alternative frontend to YouTube. It is available as a Docker container, or from the GitHub master branch. It is intended to be used as a lightweight and "privacy-respecting" alternative to the official YouTube website. Many privacy preserving redirecting software as well as YouTube clients use Invidious instances.

Invidious does not use the official YouTube API but scrapes the website for video and metadata such as likes and views. This is done intentionally to decrease the amount of data shared with Google, but YouTube can still see a user's IP address. The web-scraping tool is called the Invidious Developer API.

Third Party Applications that support Invidious
Application name	Operating System
FreeTube	Linux, MacOS, Windows, Web (Invidious API only), Android (in fork)
Yatee	macOS, iOS, tvOS, iPadOS
CloudTube	Web
HoloPlay	Web
WatchTube	watchOS
TubiTui	Linux, macOS, Windows
Ytfzf	Posix (Linux, macOS, etc.)
Playlet	RokuTV
GTK+ Pipe Viewer	Linux
PlasmaTube	Linux
Materialious	Linux, macOS, Windows, Web, Android
WozTubes (formerly IInvidious)	Apple II
Invidious Tizen	TizenOS
TubeHaus	Web

== History ==
In 2020, Omar Roth stated that he would be stepping down from the project and shutting down the main instance at invidio.us. However, the project still continues and unofficial instances of the service still exist.

In June 2023, Invidious received a take-down order from YouTube. The cease and desist notice followed recent "experiments" by YouTube of blocking non-premium users who use an ad-blocking web browser. The Invidious developers decided to ignore the letter as they did not use the YouTube API. Jules Roscoe of Vice.com stated YouTube was not alone in "cracking down", and noted new developer fees at Reddit are causing third-party developers to shut down. According to Der Spiegel, "Invidious is installed on servers, which then act as unlicensed YouTube mirrors" to allow users to watch videos "free of advertising and tracking." Invidious was targeted by Google due to them having struggled for years to block downloading and uncontrolled access to videos and music as well as AI scrapers.

== See also ==
- Youtube-dl
- Nitter, a X viewer inspired by Invidious
