= SuEXEC =

suEXEC
- Developer: Apache Software Foundation
- Repository: svn.apache.org/repos/asf/httpd/httpd/trunk/modules/generators/mod_suexec.c
- Written in: C
- Included with: Apache HTTP Server
- Type: Apache module
- License: Apache-2.0

Apache suEXEC is a feature of the Apache web server. It allows users to run Common Gateway Interface (CGI) and Server Side Includes (SSI) applications as a different user. Normally, all web server processes run as the default web server user (often wwwrun, www-data, apache or nobody). The suEXEC feature consists of a module for the web server and a binary executable which acts as a wrapper. suEXEC was introduced in Apache 1.2 and is often included in the default Apache package provided by most Linux distributions.

If a client requests a CGI and suEXEC is activated, it will call the suEXEC binary which then wraps the CGI scripts and executes it under the user account of the server process (virtual host) defined in the virtual host directive.

Additionally, suEXEC perform a multi-step check on the executed CGI to ensure security for the server (including path-checks, a limit of permitted commands, etc.)

== Example ==
User "Alice" has a website including some Common Gateway Interface script files in her own public_html (a common web root directory name) folder, which can be accessed by https://example.com/~alice.

User "Bob" now views Alice's webpage, which requires Apache to run one of these CGI scripts.

Instead of running all scripts as "wwwrun" (which results in the need that all scripts have to be readable and executable for the "wwwrun" group if the file is owned by that group or for all users otherwise), the scripts in /home/alice/public_html will be wrapped using suEXEC and run with Alice's user ID resulting in higher security and eliminating the need to make the scripts readable and executable for all users or everyone in the "wwwrun" group (instead only Alice herself needs to be able to run the script).
