= IMO =

IMO or Imo may refer to:

== Maritime ==
- International Maritime Organization
  - IMO number, a unique identity number issued to seacraft (pattern "1234567")
- SS Imo, a 1889 ship involved in the Halifax Explosion

== Meteorology ==
- International Meteorological Organization
- Icelandic Meteorological Office

== Other ==
- Irish Medical Organisation
- Intelligent Medical Objects, a privately held company specializing in medical vocabularies
- Isomaltooligosaccharide, a mixture of short-chain carbohydrates which has a digestion-resistant property
- Idiopathic Massive Osteolysis, a name for Gorham's disease, a rare bone disease
- International Mathematical Olympiad
- International Meteor Organization
- Imo State, Nigeria
- imo.im, a video calling and instant messaging app
- IMO (in my opinion), an Internet slang expression
- Intestinal methanogen overgrowth
