= Zeus Technology =

UK software company

- Type: Subsidiary of Ivanti
- Industry: Technology
- Founded: 1995
- Founder: Damian Reeves, Adam Twiss
- Fate: Acquired
- Successor: Riverbed Technology, Brocade, Pulse Secure, Ivanti
- Headquarters: Cambridge, England, UK
- Products: Application Delivery Controller, Load Balancers, Web servers, Web Application Firewall
- Number of employees: 40
- Parent: Ivanti
- Website: http://www.zeus.com

Zeus Technology, Ltd. was a software company founded in 1995 and based in Cambridge, England, known for its web server. In July 2011, Zeus Technology was acquired by Riverbed Technology. In March 2015, Riverbed Technology sold the SteelApp business unit to Brocade Communications Systems. In June 2017, Brocade Communications Systems sold the vADC business unit to Pulse Secure. In December 2020 Pulse Secure, including the vADC business unit, was acquired by Ivanti.

== History ==
Zeus Technology was founded in 1995 by Damian Reeves and Adam Twiss while they were undergraduates at Churchill College, University of Cambridge.

The company grew rapidly during the excesses of the Dot-com boom. In June 2000 Zeus Technology was nominated one of the top 50 most important privately held companies in the world by Red Herring and one of the Top 100 Emerging Technology Companies by Tornado Insider in May 2001. A public flotation was anticipated but Zeus Technology remained privately held until its 2011 acquisition.

During 2001 and 2002, almost 3% of the world's websites ran on Zeus Web Server. For much of 2003, Zeus Web Server was the third most popular web server (after Apache and Microsoft IIS).

As competitors matured and Windows NT platforms became more commonplace in the web serving environment, Zeus Web Server's share shrank significantly. In April 2006, the Zeus Web Server held approximately 0.7% market share.

In June 2011, Zeus acquired Art of Defence, a Bavarian software company founded in 2005 that develops a distributed Web Application Firewall called hyperguard.

In July 2011, Zeus Technology was acquired by Riverbed Technology for $110m.

In March 2015, Riverbed Technology sold the SteelApp business unit to Brocade Communications Systems.

In June 2017, Brocade Communications Systems sold the vADC business unit to Pulse Secure.

In December 2020 Pulse Secure, including the vADC business unit, was acquired by Ivanti.

== Product ==
Zeus' original product, first released in 1995, was Zeus Web Server which became known as one of the highest-performance web servers for Unix and Unix-like platforms.

In 2004 Zeus Technology released Zeus Traffic Manager (originally 'Zeus Extensible Traffic Manager', ZXTM), based on Zeus' earlier Zeus Load Balancer product, a software load balancer for TCP and UDP based network protocols. Traffic Manager managed application traffic, inspecting, transforming and routing requests across the application infrastructure. Zeus's TrafficScript engine enabled users to implement whatever traffic management policies were most appropriate. The product was marketed by Riverbed as SteelApp, having earlier been known as Stingray Traffic Manager.

In 2005, Zeus released the first in a range of own-name hardware appliances through an OEM relationship with Pyramid GMBH; Zeus changed suppliers to Sun Microsystems in 2008, and later discontinued the production of hardware appliances of this sort.

2006 saw the release of Zeus Extensible Traffic Manager Virtual Appliance, announced to coincide with the launch of VMware's Virtual Appliance Marketplace.

In April 2008, Zeus released ZXTM version 5.0, with Java(TM) Extensions and SIP and RTSP capabilities, as well as IPv6 support, followed by version 5.1 later that year. October 2009 saw the release of version 6.0, accompanied by a renaming from 'ZXTM' to 'Zeus Traffic Manager'.

ApacheBench, the benchmarking tool bundled with Apache HTTP Server, was originally written by Adam Twiss and donated to the Apache Group.
