= ClipGrab =

Video download manager

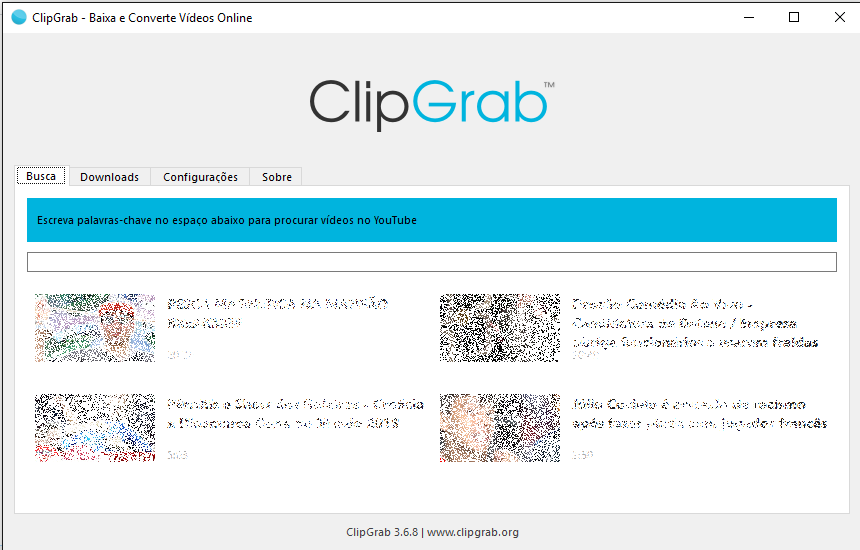
- Developer: libre media labs GmbH
- Release: 5 November 2007; 18 years ago
- Stable release: 3.9.15 / November 27, 2025; 10 months ago
- Preview release: 4.0.0-beta2 (macOS)
- Operating system: Microsoft Windows, macOS, Linux
- Available in: English, German, French
- Type: Download manager
- License: GPL-3.0-or-later
- Website: https://clipgrab.org/

ClipGrab is an Open source video download manager, allowing downloads of videos from a variety of websites such as YouTube, Vimeo, Dailymotion, Facebook, or Instagram.

It can save downloaded files in their original format or convert them to other file formats such as MP3, MPEG4, OGG Theora or WMV. It is published as free software under the terms of the GPL-3.0-or-later license. It is developed and maintained by libre media labs GmbH.

As of 2026, the developer's website lists a Windows version (3.9.15), a beta of version 4.0.0 for macOS, and a 64-bit Linux build (3.9.14) with source code.

== Features ==
ClipGrab officially supports the download from a handful of video websites which include YouTube, Dailymotion, Vimeo, and Facebook. In addition to this, the software provides a heuristic that can also download videos from sites that are not officially supported. When available, ClipGrab offers different quality options for a video. With this feature, the user can choose between downloading a high-definition, standard-definition, or low-definition version of the video. ClipGrab can automatically detect compatible URLs when they are copied to the clipboard. The program provides an integrated search function for YouTube. It also lets the user convert the downloaded files to other file formats such as MP3, MPEG4, OGG Theora or WMV. It has especially been praised for its clean and easy-to-use user interface. Software review site Softoxi.com states that "[ClipGrab] has a beautifully designed graphical user interface" and "stands out immediately for its look, feel and performance"

== License ==
ClipGrab is published as free software under the GPL-3.0-or-later license

== Development ==
ClipGrab was originally developed in the proprietary programming language PureBasic, and could only download one video at a time. Later, the software was rewritten using C++ and the Qt framework and published under the terms of the GPL-3.0-or-later license. Since version 3.0, the program is also available for macOS.

ClipGrab was created by Philipp Schmieder. Its release notes record frequent updates to restore compatibility with YouTube and other sites after those sites changed. Later versions replaced the youtube-dl extraction library with its fork yt-dlp, which the developers said brought faster downloads, support for more sites and more stable downloads. Subsequent releases made H.264 the preferred video codec where available, for compatibility with older players and devices, and raised the minimum supported Windows version to Windows 10.

== Reception ==
Reviewing ClipGrab for TechRadar in 2017, Sofia Elizabella Wyciślik-Wilson described it as well designed and easy to use. She highlighted its built-in YouTube search and its clipboard monitoring, which starts a download when a supported link is copied. She noted as a drawback that searches return only 12 results.

The terms of service of the major video-hosting sites prohibit downloading content without the copyright owner's permission, and reviewers of ClipGrab have advised users to download only content they have the right to save.
