= Abmahnung =

German term for a written warning

An Abmahnung (German term for a written warning) is a formal request by one person to another person to forthwith stop a certain behaviour.

If this formal request is made by an attorney, then it is similar to a cease-and-desist letter (but not a cease-and-desist order, which in turn is similar to a einstweilige Verfügung in German law). Anyone who is harmed by the offending action and thus has an Unterlassungsanspruch can send an Abmahnung. Trademark violations, copyright infringement, and not complying with disclosure and information requirements harm the public, so the Gesetz gegen den unlauteren Wettbewerb permits competitors, interest groups who operate on the same market as the offender, consumer protection organisations, and Chambers of Commerce to file an Abmahnung.

In most cases, the law allows the party sending the letter to demand payment of legal costs associated with the sending of the letter. In theory, this allows anybody that observes a violation of a law that may be covered by an Abmahnung to hire an attorney, have a letter sent, and be reimbursed for the attorney's fees. Reimbursement of attorney's fees is excluded in cases of violations against information requirements, if the violation is committed on the internet and the filer is a competitor. Since the enormous proliferation of web sites, there have been waves of frivolous Abmahnungen, the so-called Abmahnwellen, as lawyers and copyright holders search for even minor and usually unintended violations of e.g. copyright law on the internet, with some law firms sending thousands of letters per year demanding payment.
