= Stream ripping =

Process of saving data streams to a file

Stream ripping (also called stream recording) is the process of saving data streams to a file. The process is sometimes referred to as destreaming.

Stream ripping is most often referred in the context of saving audio or video from streaming media websites and services such as YouTube outside of the officially-provided means of offline playback (if any) using unsanctioned software and tools. This is often prohibited under each respective website or service's Terms of Use.

== Legality ==
The Recording Industry Association of America (RIAA) has taken stances against tools that are, in particular, used to rip content from YouTube, citing that their use to download music from the website and convert them to audio formats constitutes a violation of their members' copyrights. The RIAA has targeted various stream ripping websites (including the websites themselves, and listings for them via search engines) under the anti-circumvention provisions of the U.S. Digital Millennium Copyright Act (DMCA), under its claim that a "rolling cipher" used by YouTube to generate the URL for the video file itself constitutes a technical protection measure, since it is "intended to inhibit direct access to the underlying YouTube video files, thereby preventing or inhibiting the downloading, copying, or distribution of the video files". Unlike the more common forms of takedowns performed under the Online Copyright Infringement Liability Limitation Act, there is no scheme of counter-notices for such takedowns. These actions have faced criticism, noting that there are legitimate uses for these services beyond ripping music, such as downloading video content needed to utilize one's right to fair use, or explicit rights of reuse (such as free content licenses) granted by a content creator.

In October 2020, the RIAA similarly issued takedowns to code hosting service GitHub targeting youtube-dl, an open source tool for similar purposes, also citing circumvention of the aforementioned "rolling cipher", as well as usage examples in its readme file that "expressly suggests" its use with copyrighted works.

On November 16, 2020, GitHub later reinstated youtube-dl and subsequently released a related blog post with more information on the status of the takedown.

On February 9, 2023, GitHub and the Electronic Frontier Foundation filed amicus curiae contesting the ruling against a stream ripping service, Yout, concerning that the ruling could render many software that add features or customize user experience as a circumvention violation, and arguing that lacking features such as a download button is not a technical protection measure because YouTube allowed any browser to access its videos including browsers that allow users to customize them.

== See also ==
- Protection of Broadcasts and Broadcasting Organizations Treaty
