= Infineta Systems =

Networking hardware company

- Company type: Private
- Industry: Networking hardware
- Founded: California 2008
- Fate: shutdown and sold IP to Riverbed Technology, Inc.
- Headquarters: Santa Clara, California
- Website: www.infineta.com

Infineta Systems was a company that made WAN optimization products for high performance, latency-sensitive network applications. The company advertised that it allowed application data rate to exceed the nominal data rate of the link. Infineta Systems ceased operations by February 2013, a liquidator was appointed, and its products will no longer be manufactured, sold or distributed.

Riverbed Technology purchased some of Infineta's assets from the liquidator.

== Company ==
Infineta was founded in 2008 by Raj Kanaya, the CEO, and K.V.S. Ramarao, the CTO. Ramarao concluded the computational resources, especially I/O operations and CPU cycles, associated with data compression technologies would ultimately limit their scalability. He and Kanaya determined founded Infineta to develop algorithms and hardware. The company had six patents pending.

Infineta was headquartered in San Jose, California and attracted $30 million in two rounds of venture funding from Alloy Ventures, North Bridge Venture Partners, and Rembrandt Venture Partners.

== Products ==
Infineta announced its Data Mobility Switch in June 2011. The DMS was the first WAN optimization technology to work at throughput rates of 10 Gbit/s. Infineta designed the product in FPGA hardware around a multi-Gigabit switch fabric to minimize latency. The DMS used compression similar to data deduplication.

The product was designed to addresses the long-standing issue of TCP performance on long fat networks, so even unreduced data can achieve throughputs equivalent to the WAN bandwidth. To illustrate what this means, take the example of transferring a 2.5 GBytes (20 billion bits) file from New York to Chicago (15 ms latency, 30 ms round-trip time ) over a 1 Gbit/s link. With standard TCP, which uses a 64 KB window size, the file transfer would take about 20 minutes. The theoretical maximum throughput is 1 Gbit/s, or about 20 seconds. The DMS performs the transfer in 19.5 to 21 seconds.

== See also ==
- Data migration
- WAN optimization
- Network latency
- Network congestion
