= Research Park at the University of Illinois Urbana-Champaign =

Coordinates: 40°5′28.0″N 88°14′24.6″W

Research Park at University of Illinois Urbana-Champaign
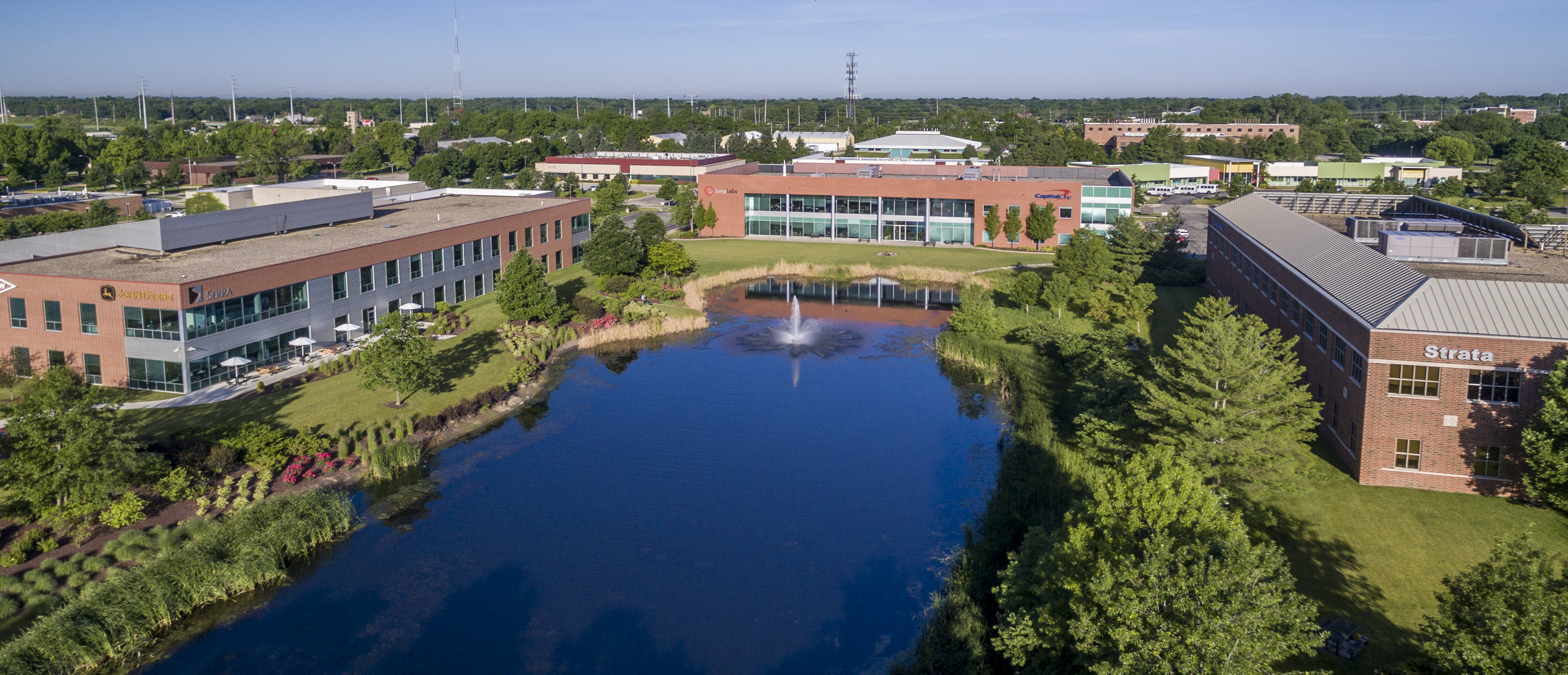
- Aerial View of the University of Illinois Research Park

Research Park at University of Illinois Urbana-Champaign
- 60 Hazelwood Drive; Champaign, Illinois, 61820

Information
- Established: 1999
- Area: 663,000 sq-ft
- Companies: 100+
- Structures: 17
- Employees: 2100+
- Student Interns: 800+
- Website: Official Site

Research Park at the University of Illinois Urbana-Champaign is a research park located in the southwest part of the University of Illinois Urbana-Champaign campus in Champaign, Illinois. Research Park is a technology hub for startup companies and corporate research and development operations. Within Research Park there are more than 120 companies employing more than 2,100 people including students and full-time technology professionals.

Multinational and publicly traded corporations in the Research Park include: ADM, Abbott Laboratories, AbbVie, Ameren, AGCO, bp, Bayer, Brunswick, Capital One, Cargill, Caterpillar, CME Group, Corteva, Deere & Company, Kohler, Littelfuse, Motorola Solutions, Nutrien Ag Solutions, NVIDIA, Riverbed, Rivian, State Farm, Synchrony, and Yahoo (Verizon Media Group).

Research Park is also home to over 50 startup companies that are commercializing technology. EnterpriseWorks, the Research Park's 43,000-square-foot business incubator for early-stage tech firms, is operated by the University of Illinois to help launch successful startup companies.

== History ==
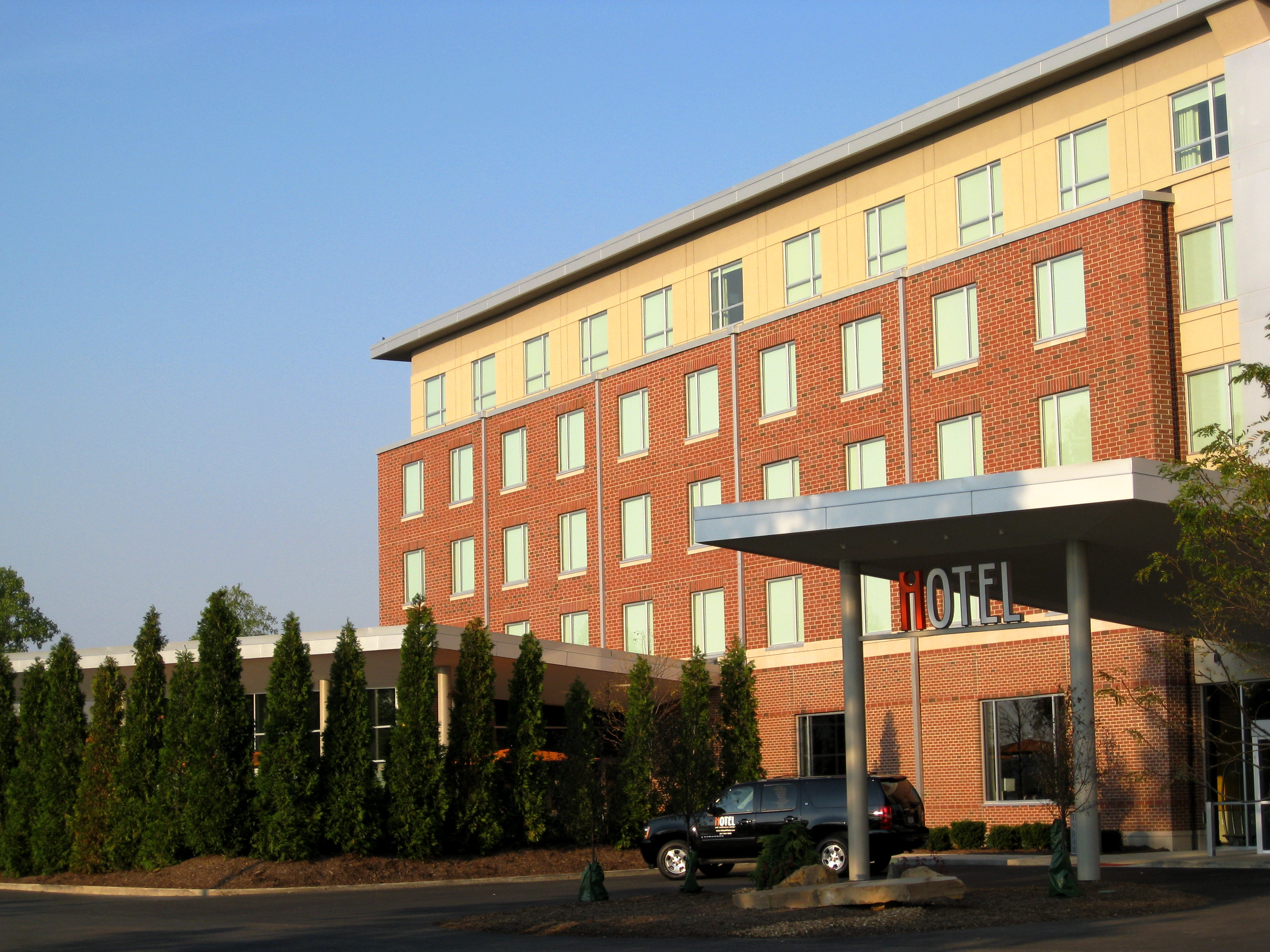
I-Hotel located within Research Park in Champaign, Illinois

Research Park gained the approval of the board of trustees in November 1999 and established its governance with the University of Illinois Research Park Limited Liability Company in March 2000. The Research Park opened its first building in 2001 and grew into a 200-acre technology hub for corporate research and development operations.

In 2003, the State of Illinois provided funding to build the EnterpriseWorks Incubator, a 43,000 square-foot business technology incubator for early-stage tech firms, and the first tenants moved in during early 2004. In May 2000, the University entered into a partnership with Fox/Atkins who now leases the land from the university and constructs customized buildings for Research Park's tenants. The company is responsible for transforming the land from fish ponds, agricultural fields, and livestock barns.

By 2004, the Research Park hosted 35 tenants, 702 employees and 5 buildings.

== New Developments ==
The next phase of development in the new master developer agreement is to add 160 acres of additional land east of the main Research Park area. The total operation in Research Park annually contributes $4.1 million in tax revenues to the state of Illinois. The total construction over 10 years contributed $7.2 million in state tax revenue.

The Research Park Master Plan, adopted in September 2018 by the University of Illinois Board of Trustees, aims to double its size and continue attracting more companies, employees, and private development.

This vision is a concept for a new building that would address two known factors impacting the future growth of the Research Park. The first being a lack of adequate lab facilities for growth-stage startup companies, in the community and throughout the state of Illinois; secondly, the need for additional Research Park community spaces providing an environment for creative collisions between the companies, employees, and faculty.

== EnterpriseWorks Incubator ==
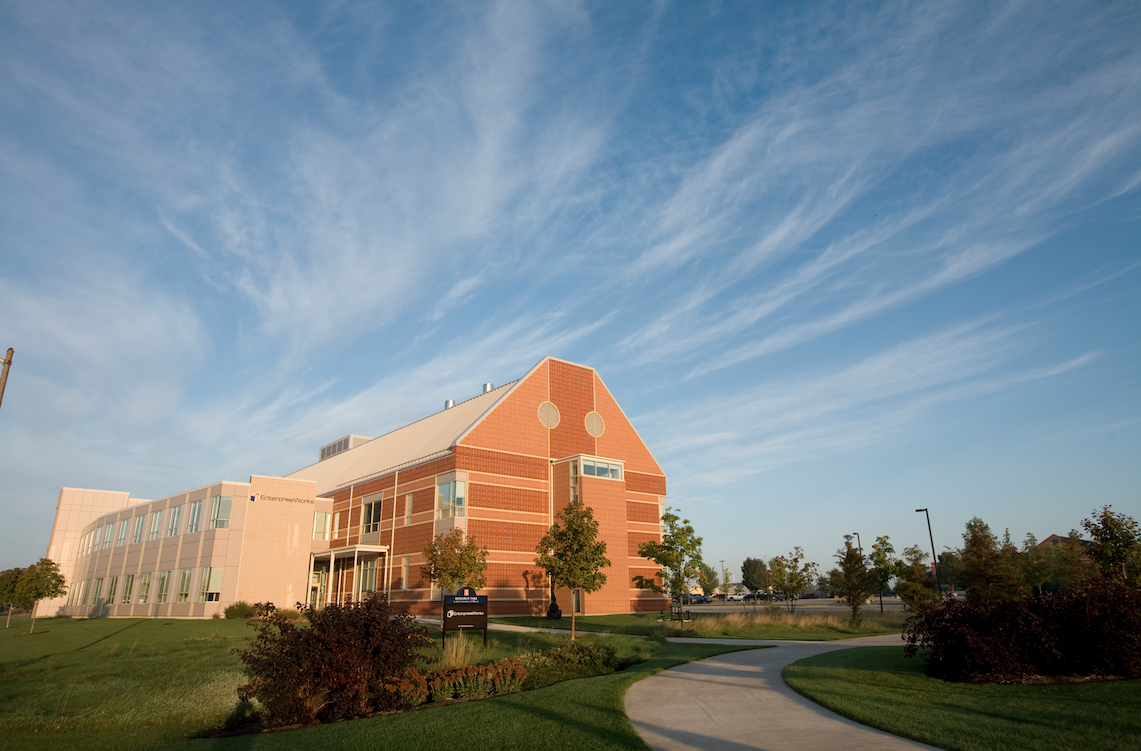
EnterpriseWorks Incubator located in the University of Illinois Research Park

The EnterpriseWorks Incubator provides a bridge between the research of the University and the commercialization of technology by university faculty, researchers, and students. The award-winning incubator provides free counseling services to technology entrepreneurs and facilities such as laboratories, offices, conference rooms, kitchen, and co-working space. The Entrepreneur-in-Residence program is a free service provided by Research Park which consists of 7 experience tech entrepreneurs who provide monthly consulting to new startup ventures and prospective entrepreneurs. Research Park and the EnterpriseWorks Incubator hold educational, training, social, and networking events to facilitate a community feel while providing a place where the newest startups have the opportunity to develop relationships with established national and international corporations.

The incubator has basic labs as well as full fit-out labs for chemical and life science companies. All leases in EnterpriseWorks last one year; renewal is based on company progress and the continued need for services.

In addition to office and lab space, EnterpriseWorks offers complementary conference room space to its tenants. Rooms for groups from six to 30 persons are available by reservation. Kitchen and vending services are also on-site.

== Notable tenants ==
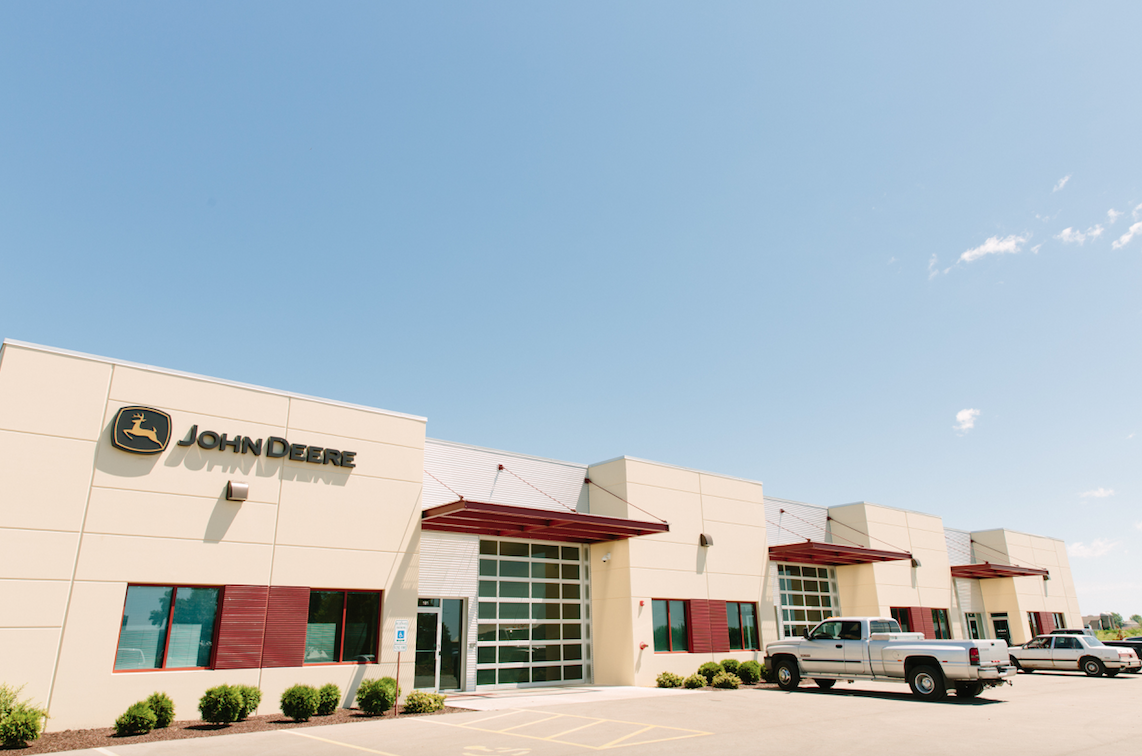
John Deere at the University of Illinois Research Park

- Abbott Laboratories
- AbbVie
- Archer Daniels Midland
- Ameren
- Anheuser-Busch InBev
- Bayer
- Brunswick
- Caterpillar
- CME Group
- Country Financial
- Dow Agrosciences
- Indoor Climate Research & Training
- Intelligent Medical Objects
- John Deere
- Littelfuse
- Motorola Solutions
- NVIDIA
- Riverbed Technology
- Synchrony
- Syngenta
- State Farm
- Yahoo Inc.

As of 2019, 24 percent of startups at EnterpriseWorks have been founded by University students, while startups led by faculty and staff members account for 55 percent.

== Notable graduates ==
- ShareThis in 2007
- Bump (application) in 2014

== Awards ==
- EnterpriseWorks receives $50,000 award from the Small Business Administration Growth Accelerator Fund Competition
- Urbana, IL named a Top Startup City by Popular Mechanics, mainly due to the UI Research Park community
- One of Three College-Town Incubators to watch by Inc.com in June 2013
- One of 12 Business Incubators Changing the World by Forbes.com in 2013
- Top 10 Start-Up Incubator to watch by Inc.com in 2011
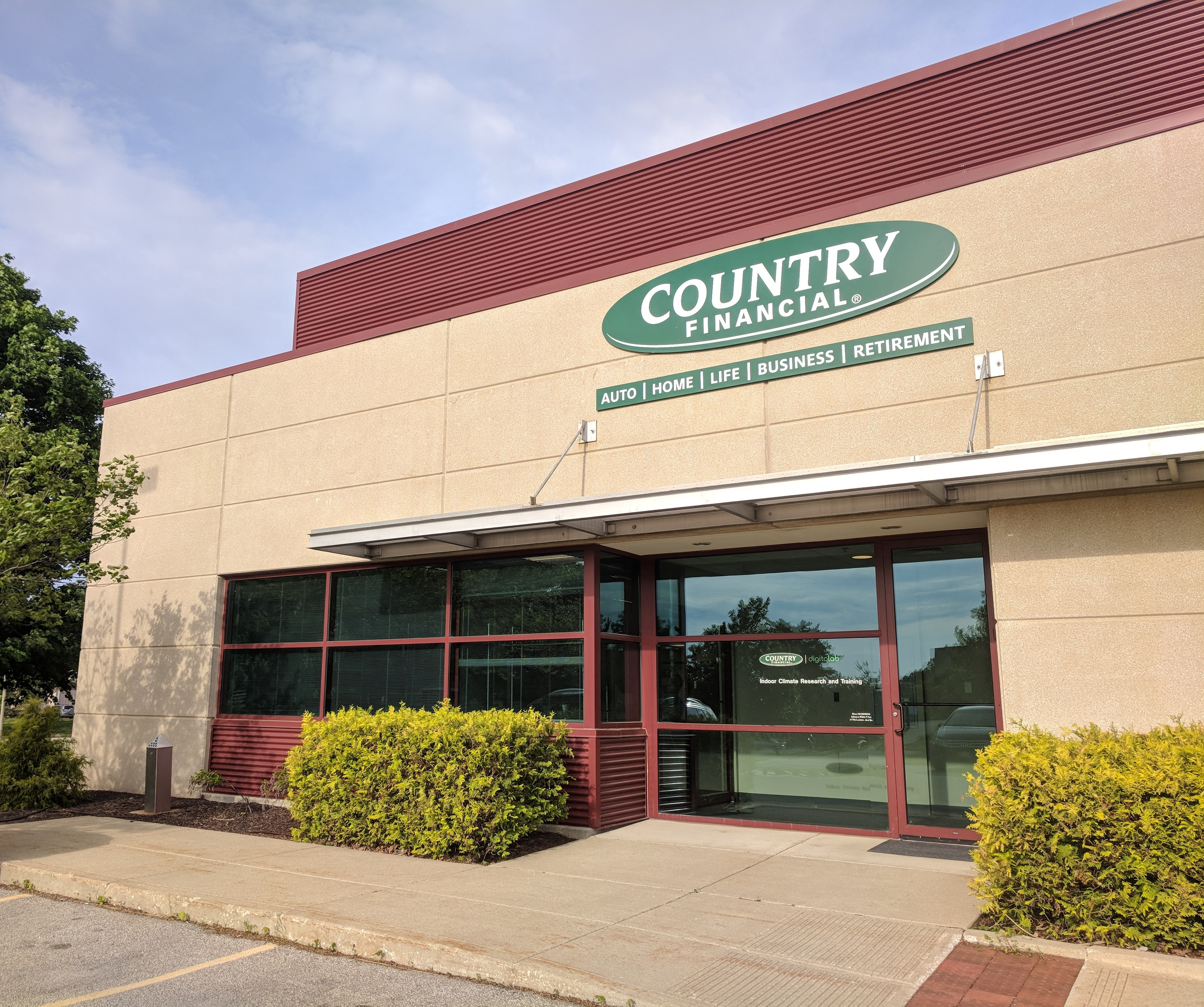
  The Country Financial Digitalab in Research Park
- Outstanding Research Park Award by the Association of University Research Parks in 2011
- Top 10 Technology Incubator that is changing the world by Forbes.com in 2010 In 2011

== Recent company openings ==
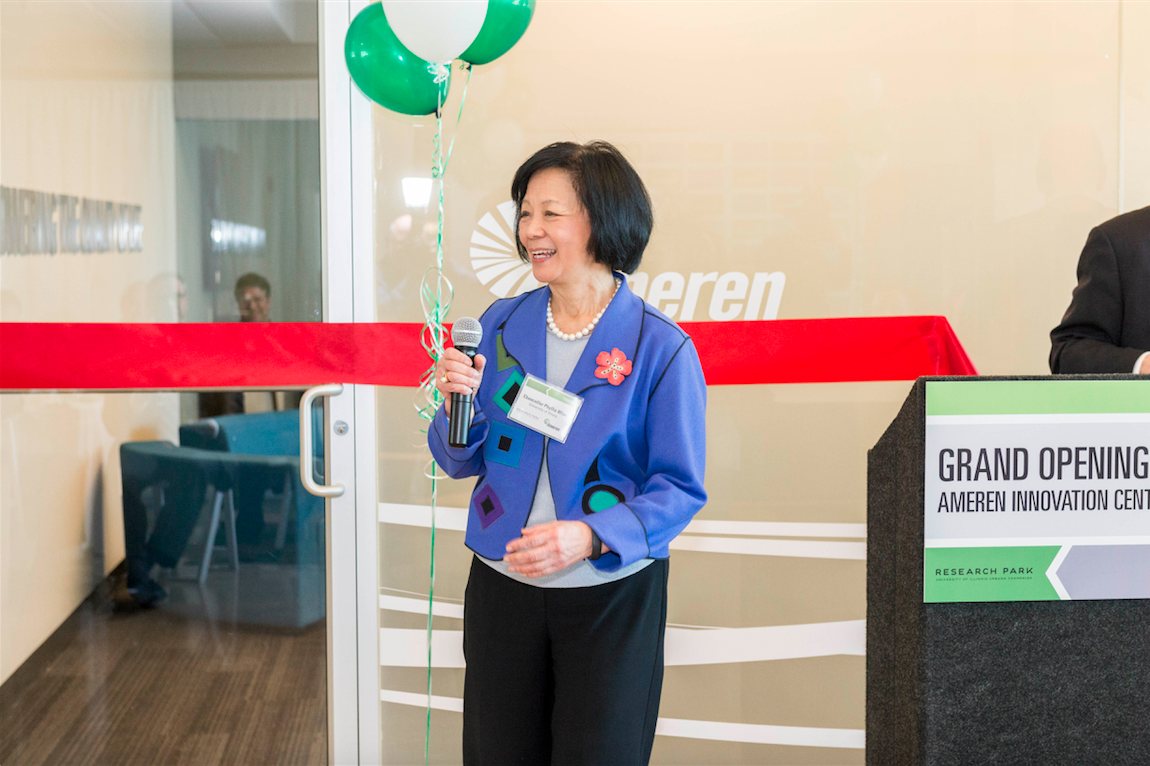
Chancellor Phyllis Wise at the Ameren Innovation Center Grand Opening at the University of Illinois Research Park

- BP Innovation Center in April 2019
- Synchrony Emerging Technology Center in April 2018
- Monsanto Innovation Center in February 2018
- AGCO Acceleration Center in January 2018
- Country Financial Digitalab in November 2017
- Carle Orthopedics and Sports Medicine Facility in January 2017
- AARP Tech Nest in October 2016
- CME Group Innovation Center in September 2016
- CEB Data Innovation Center in March 2016
- Agrible New Headquarters in November 2015
- Granular Regional Headquarters in November 2015
- Capital One Digital Campus Lab in October 2015
- Dow Chemical Company AgroSciences Innovation Center in September 2015
- Caterpillar Inc. Data Innovation Lab in February 2015
- Ameren Innovation Center in February 2015
- AbbVie Innovation Center in January 2015
- TURN Innovation Center in April 2014
- Anheuser-Busch Grand Opening in September 2013
- Dow Chemical Company Innovation Center in January 2013
