= YouTube Vanced =

Modified third-party YouTube application

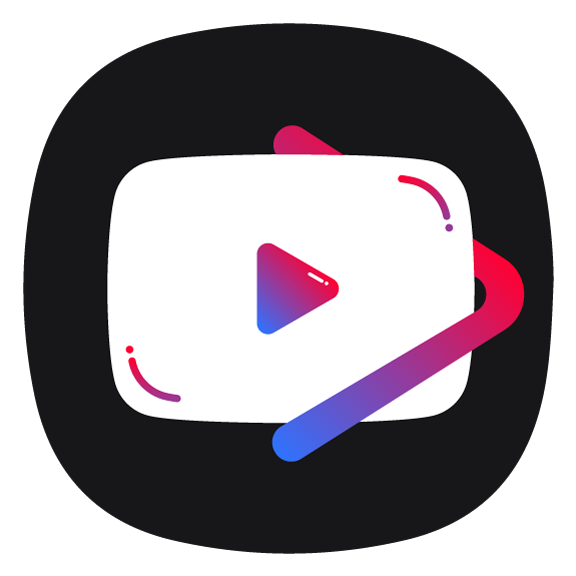
- Other names: Vanced, iYTBP
- Original authors: Master_T, ZaneZam, laura almeida, MxskedDx, Razerman, Anova's Origin, arter97
- Developers: bhatvikrant, milindgoel15, mlnrDev, Vendicated, X1nto
- Release: February 21, 2017; 9 years ago
- Final release: 17.03.38 / February 17, 2022; 4 years ago
- Operating system: Android
- License: GNU General Public License v3.0 (Vanced Manager)
- Website: vancedapp.com

YouTube Vanced (or simply Vanced, formerly iYTBP) is a discontinued third-party modification of the YouTube application for Android. It adds features such as a built-in ad blocker, SponsorBlock, and implementation of the Return YouTube Dislike browser extension. Modified versions of YouTube Music and MicroG were also developed.

The name Vanced references the software's ad blocking features, removing ad from the word advanced.

YouTube Vanced and its YouTube Music and MicroG counterparts could be downloaded and updated via the Vanced Manager using pre-built APK files.

On March 13, 2022, the developers of YouTube Vanced announced that the application would be shut down after they received a cease and desist letter from Google over distributing pre-built application files. The developers were forced to stop developing and distributing the app.

== Features ==
YouTube Vanced allowed access to multiple YouTube Premium features, such as the picture-in-picture mode, which allowed for videos to be watched in a floating window, ad block, which removed advertisements in the app, and background play, which allowed for videos to be played as audio in the background. Vanced also implemented other features, such as SponsorBlock, background play, free picture-in-picture, an AMOLED black theme, swipe control for brightness and volume, the enabling of pinch-to-zoom on all mobile devices, the ability to automatically repeat videos after finishing, and the carrying over of video quality and speed preferences from video to video.

YouTube Music Vanced offered YouTube Premium-like features similar to those of YouTube Vanced, including ad block.

== Derivative software ==
=== ReVanced ===
ReVanced is an open source Android app created after YouTube Vanced was taken down. It allows users to patch various apps in order to gain access to features normally locked behind subscriptions or pay walls. In 2026, the ReVanced repository on GitHub was taken down due to a DMCA claim from the developers of Morphe, a fork of ReVanced. The DMCA was filed because the ReVanced repository contained unattributed code taken from Morphe.

=== Morphe ===
Morphe is an open-source fork of ReVanced created by former ReVanced developers that allows users to patch the YouTube, YouTube Music, and Reddit mobile apps. It, unlike the original Vanced, does not distribute files that have already been patched. It began development after conflict arose between one individual and the rest of the ReVanced developers.

== See also ==
- youtube-dl
