= Nitter =

Alternative front end for X (social network)

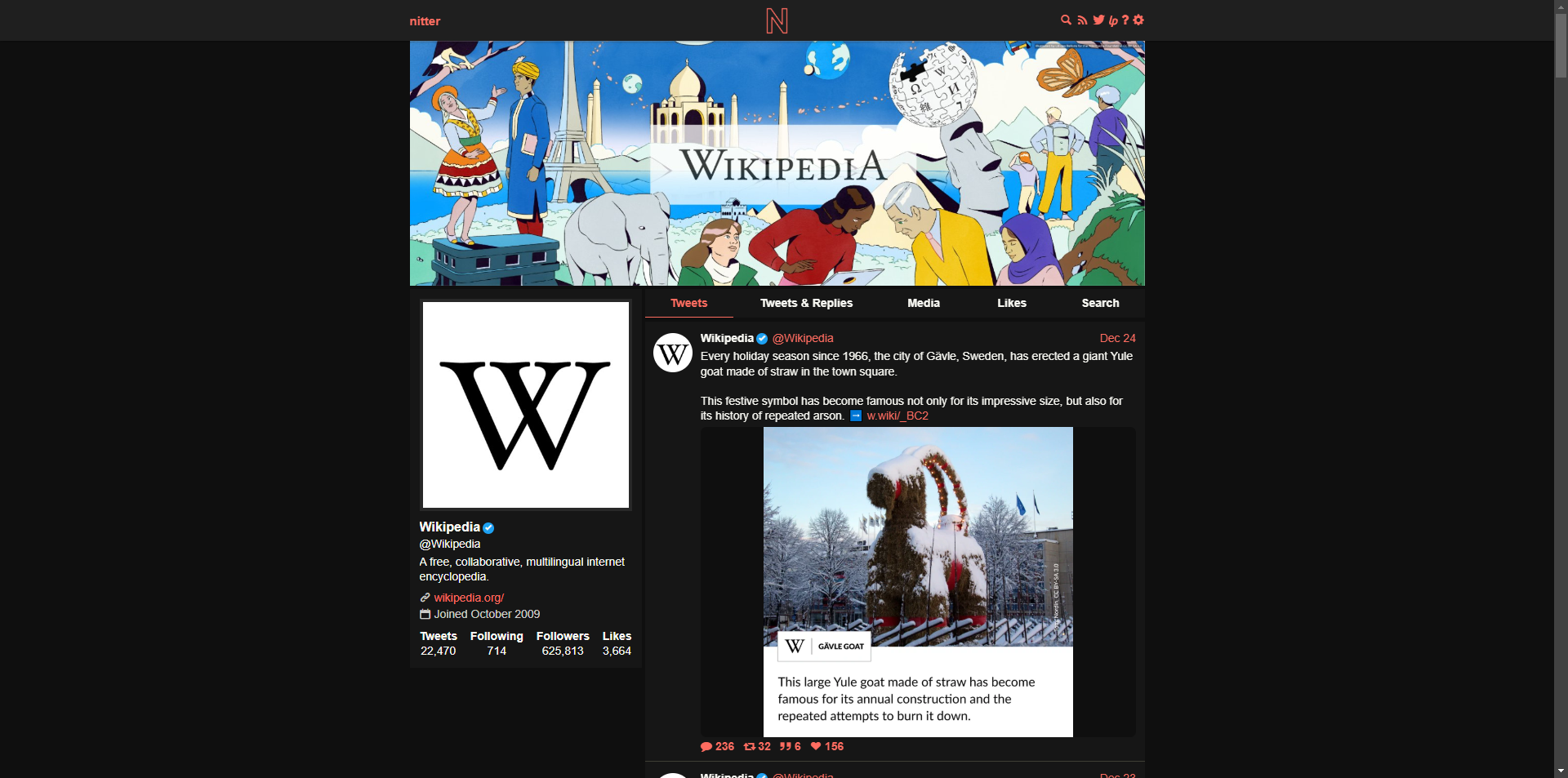
- Typical microblog display page for a Nitter instance, showing Twitter (X) user with posts.
- Developer: Zedeus (and contributors)
- Release: 19 June 2019; 7 years ago
- Final release: 2026.03.15-7ce29bd / 15 March 2026; 7 months ago
- Written in: Nim, SCSS, Python, CSS, JavaScript
- Operating system: Unix-like
- Platform: Web
- License: AGPLv3+
- Website: nitter.net
- Repository: github.com/zedeus/nitter
- As of: 29 October 2023; 3 years ago

Nitter is a free and open source alternative frontend for X, formerly known as Twitter, (Note: Known as Twitter from 2006 until 2023, when the platform was rebranded to X following its acquisition by Elon Musk) focusing on privacy and performance. Nitter is designed to allow access to X without tracking, advertisements, or the need for an account. It only supports browsing, and cannot be used to sign in or interact with the X community. Users can view user profiles, replies, media, and individual posts alongside their comments and Quote Posts. Nitter also allows for searching by keywords, hashtags, usernames, locations, media and dates and supported the same formatting as X's native advanced search function. It also supports creating RSS feeds for X (Twitter) profiles.

== Features ==
The user interface is designed to be minimalist and resemble the classic X desktop layout. Since users can't log in to X through Nitter, Nitter has no notifications, no home feed, and no ability to tweet. By default, Nitter has no infinite scroll, although an experimental feature allowed for the usage of infinite scroll. It has no ads or tracking, and the timeline is in chronological order. Nitter relied on a glitch that allowed creating a large amount of "guest accounts" using proxy servers in order to fetch content. It now relies on using registered account tokens to access the site, as X has removed the ability to create guest accounts, and heavily restricts access to logged-out users.

In addition to the former official web instance, there are unofficial public web instances, as well as community-contributed mobile apps and browser extensions.

Nitter was funded by donations as well as a grant from the NLnet Foundation's NGI fund.

== History ==
Nitter was temporarily discontinued between February 2024 and February 2025. The developer had announced the project was "dead" after X removed the guest account feature, on which Nitter relied, in January 2024. Some instances had previously stopped working some months before due to changes to the X API. The developer stated instances could be self-hosted by having users use their own account, at the risk of the account being banned.

On 6 February 2025, Zedeus announced on GitHub Discussions that development on the project would be resuming.

=== Cease and desist ===
On 24 August 2026, a cease and desist was sent to Nitter and its instances by X Corp, accusing Nitter of scraping and demanding a permanent takedown of Nitter instances and the project's repository. The developer is seeking legal advice, and stated that "development has stopped for the time being" and the XCancel instance announced that it was offline "until further notice". On 25 August 2026, Nitter's GitHub project was archived. On 6 September 2026, it was announced that the Nitter project would continue. One day later, the XCancel site was the first Nitter instance to come back online again. However, on 11 September, Nitter's GitHub project was archived again, and on 14 September, XCancel announced it was offline again until further notice. The main Nitter website is offline.

== See also ==
- Invidious, a viewer for YouTube that inspired Nitter
