= UWSGI =

Open source software application

uWSGI
- Developer: unbit
- Stable release: 2.0.31 (maintenance only) / 11 October 2025; 9 months ago
- Written in: C
- Operating system: Cross-platform
- Type: Application server
- License: GNU General Public License v2.0 + linking exception
- Website: uwsgi-docs.readthedocs.io
- Repository: github.com/unbit/uwsgi

uWSGI is an open source software application that "aims at developing a full stack for building hosting services". It is named after the Web Server Gateway Interface (WSGI), which was the first plugin supported by the project. uWSGI is maintained by the Italian-based software company unbit.

uwsgi (all lowercase) is the native binary protocol that uWSGI uses to communicate with other servers.

uWSGI is often used in conjunction with web servers such as Cherokee and nginx, which offer direct support for uWSGI's native uwsgi protocol, to serve Python web applications such as Django. For example, data may flow like this: HTTP client ↔ Nginx ↔ uWSGI ↔ Python app.

uWSGI has been in maintenance mode since October 24th, 2022
