= Intelligent Medical Objects =

Privately held company

IMO Health, fka Intelligent Medical Objects, Inc.
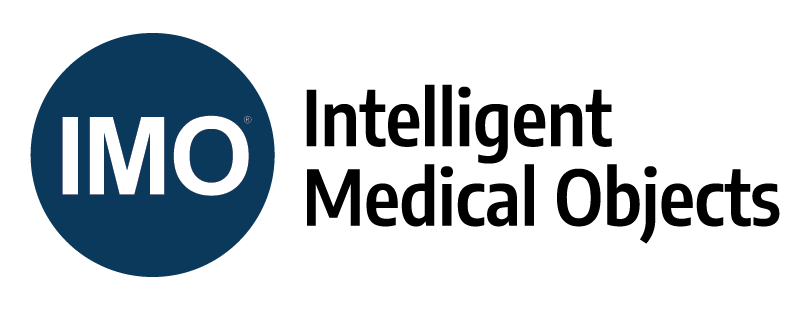
- Company type: Private
- Industry: Health informatics
- Founded: 1994
- Headquarters: Rosemont, Illinois, United States
- Key people: Ann Barnes (CEO)
- Website: www.imohealth.com

IMO Health formerly known as Intelligent Medical Objects (IMO) is a privately held company specializing in developing, managing and licensing medical vocabularies. IMO Health partners with various health care organizations, medical content providers and EHR developers.

Founded in 1994, IMO Health is based in Rosemont, Illinois. IMO Health's clinical interface terminology, which helps to map diagnostic terminologies to medical concepts and billing codes, was launched in 1995. Products such as Problem (IT) and Procedure (IT) aim to help physicians more easily choose the correct medical term for their cases, which then aids in finding the correct billing code. This allows the clinician to capture the patient condition more accurately, with more familiar terms and without slowing the EHR workflow.

These products' medical vocabularies are regularly updated so as to be mapped with standardized vocabularies such as ICD and SNOMED, as well as to adhere to the October 1, 2013/2014 date of compliance for migrating to ICD-10. Each IMO term within the clinical interface terminology is in turn mapped to the appropriate administrative code set. This allows the evolution of code sets to go on and minimize the impact on the clinician; as code sets/rules change, all re-mappings are handled by IMO Health, enabling the clinicians to continue leveraging the same vernacular.

IMO Health works with companies such as MEDITECH, Allscripts, Cerner and Epic Systems, providing vocabularies for the companies' health care software applications to be used by various hospitals and physicians in those companies' client networks. IMO's products and vocabularies are thus used in sites across the United States. In 2012, IMO Health opened a research and development office on the campus of the University of Illinois at Urbana–Champaign to be staffed by student interns from the university.

In February 2013, the Centers for Disease Control and Prevention published an article that demonstrates how IMO Health's interface terminology was found to accurately categorize coronary heart disease and heart failure events. IMO Health's terminology service was found to be 32–42% more accurate compared to algorithms using reimbursement coding and classification techniques.

Later in 2013, IMO opened up a research-and-development office in the Research Park, University of Illinois at Urbana-Champaign.

In 2023, IMO Health acquired Melax Technologies, Inc.
