= Riverbed Technology =

American information technology company

Riverbed Technology LLC
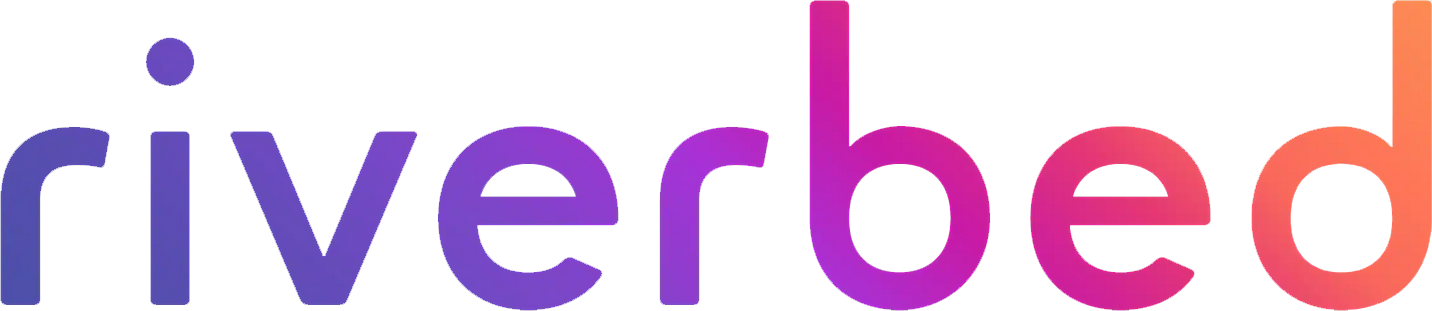
- Type: Private
- Industry: Information Technology Services
- Founded: May 23, 2002; 24 years ago
- Headquarters: San Francisco, California, United States
- Key people: Dave Donatelli (CEO)
- Products: Unified Observability, Network Visibility, End User Experience Management, SD-WAN, WAN optimization, application performance management, network performance monitoring
- Brands: Alluvio, Aternity
- Owner: Vector Capital (2023–present); Apollo Global Management (2021–2023); Thoma Bravo (2014–2021)
- Number of employees: 1,200 (2020)
- Website: www.riverbed.com

Riverbed Technology LLC is an American information technology company. Its products consist of software and hardware focused on Unified Observability, Network Visibility, End User Experience Management, network performance monitoring, application performance management, and wide area networks (WANs), including SD-WAN and WAN optimization.

Riverbed has its headquarters in Redwood City, near San Francisco. Founded in 2002, the company was recapitalized in December 2021 and its majority shareholder was Apollo Global Management at the time. In 2023, it was acquired by private equity firm Vector Capital.

== History ==
=== Origins and founding (2002) ===
Jerry Kennelly, former CEO, and Steve McCanne, former CTO, founded a technology company in May 2002, originally named NBT (Next Big Thing) Technology. The company became Riverbed Technology in 2003. Kennelly and McCanne led internal development of the first SteelHead appliances, the 500, 1000, 2000, and 5000 models, and the first SteelHead shipped in April 2004 to Environment Canada.

=== Public company and acquisition offers (2006-2015) ===
Riverbed stock began trading on NASDAQ September 21, 2006. Riverbed opened up an off-site location at Research Park, University of Illinois at Urbana-Champaign before 2009.

In February 2014, the US hedge fund Elliott Management Corporation made a $3.36 billion offer to acquire Riverbed (after a bid of $3.08 was rejected).

In October 2014 NetApp acquired Riverbed's SteelStore line of data backup and protection products, which NetApp later renamed as "AltaVault".

On December 15, 2014, Riverbed announced it would be acquired by private equity investment firm Thoma Bravo, LLC and Teachers’ Private Capital, the private investor department of Ontario Teachers’ Pension Plan. The value was estimated at $3.6 billion, and closed in April 2015.

=== Leadership and sales (2018-present) ===
On April 3, 2018, Riverbed announced the retirement of co-founder and CEO Jerry M. Kennelly and appointment of Paul Mountford as CEO.

On June 12, 2019, Riverbed announced it would resell Versa Networks SD-WAN products. On August 8, 2019, Xirrus was sold to Cambium Networks. On October 22, 2019, Rich McBee became president and CEO.

On June 9, 2021, Dan Smoot became president and CEO.

On December 7, 2021, Riverbed completed recapitalization, with Apollo Global Management as majority shareholder.

On July 11, 2023, Riverbed was acquired by private-equity firm Vector Capital, with Dave Donatelli named as new chief executive officer.

== Acquisitions ==
On February 20, 2009, Riverbed completed the acquisition of Mazu Networks. The Mazu products, which were initially renamed Cascade (and in 2014 became part of Riverbed SteelCentral), analyze network traffic to provide information about the interactions of and dependencies between users, applications and systems.

On October 21, 2010, Riverbed acquired CACE Technologies, and folded its Shark network analysis product and Pilot interface product into the Riverbed Cascade product suite. CACE was also the corporate sponsor of the open source network protocol analyzer product Wireshark. Riverbed assumed corporate sponsorship.

In November 2010, Riverbed acquired Global Protocols, LLC, a provider of satellite optimization to the defense marketplace. Its SkipWare product, a proprietary commercial implementation of the Space Communications Protocol Specifications (SCPS), is used in US Department of Defense communications satellites.

On July 19, 2011, Riverbed acquired Zeus Technology, a provider of high-performance software-based load balancing and traffic management for virtual and cloud computing environments. Its primary product was the Zeus Virtual Application Delivery Controller (vADC) which evolved into Riverbed SteelApp. On the same day, Riverbed acquired Aptimize Limited, a provider of web content optimization technology, based in Wellington, New Zealand. Brocade announced its intent to acquire the Riverbed SteelApp business in February 2015, and that acquisition completed in March 2015.

On January 11, 2012, Riverbed purchased assets of Expand Networks, including its intellectual property, out of liquidation in Israel.

In December 2012, Riverbed acquired OPNET Technologies for $1 billion. OPNET, based in Bethesda, Maryland, provided performance analysis software for applications and networks, which evolved into Riverbed SteelCentral.

On January 19, 2016, Riverbed Technology acquired Germany-based Ocedo, a provider of software-defined networking and SD-WAN technology. Using software-defined networking technology acquired from Ocedo, Riverbed announced SteelConnect in April 2016.

In August 2016, Riverbed acquired Aternity Inc., a company that provides end-user experience and application performance monitoring technology, to expand Riverbed's SteelCentral performance monitoring capabilities.

In April 2017, Riverbed acquired Xirrus, a Wi-Fi technology company. The acquisition expanded Riverbed's SteelConnect technology with the integration of cloud-managed Wi-Fi service.

November 22, 2017, Riverbed acquired FlowTraq.

== Legal proceedings ==
=== Silver Peak Systems ===
From 2011 to 2013, Riverbed was engaged in several lawsuits with Silver Peak Systems over alleged patent infringement. In June 2015, the companies announced a settlement of the suits in U.S. District Courts in Delaware and Northern District of California. As part of the settlement, the parties agreed to a mutual release and cross-license regarding all asserted patents, as well as all patents and applications in the asserted patents' "patent families". In addition, all claims and counterclaims were dismissed and no payments were made by either party.

=== Zeus Technology ===
In connection with Riverbed's July 2011 acquisition of the outstanding securities of Zeus Technology Limited, the share purchase agreement provided for certain additional potential payments (acquisition-related contingent consideration) totaling up to $27.0 million in cash, based on achievement of certain bookings targets related to Zeus products for the period from July 20, 2011, through July 31, 2012 (the Zeus earn-out period). The share purchase agreement also provided for a potential $3.0 million payment as an incentive bonus to former employees of Zeus, based on achievement of certain bookings targets related to Zeus products for the Zeus Earn-Out period. In October 2012 Riverbed served the representative of the Zeus shareholders, as lead defendant and proposed defendant class representative for all other similarly situated former shareholders of Zeus, with a lawsuit, requesting declaratory judgment that, among other things, (a) Riverbed is not in breach of the share purchase agreement, and (b) Riverbed does not owe any acquisition-related contingent consideration under the share purchase agreement because the necessary conditions precedent to the payment of acquisition-related contingent consideration did not occur.

== See also ==
- Infineta Systems, partially acquired by Riverbed Technology
