= Cease and desist =

Document with the purpose of warning

A cease and desist letter is a document sent by a party, often a business, to warn another party that they believe the other party is committing an unlawful act, such as copyright infringement, and that they will take legal action if the other party continues the alleged unlawful activity. The letter may warn that if the recipient does not discontinue specified conduct or take certain actions by the deadlines set in the letter, the recipient may be sued. The phrase "cease and desist" is a legal doublet, made up of two near-synonyms. A cease and desist letter issued by a government entity, called a cease and desist order, is "a warning of impending judicial enforcement".

== Usage for intellectual property ==
Although cease and desist letters are not exclusively used in the area of intellectual property, particularly in regards to copyright infringement, such letters "are frequently utilized in disputes concerning intellectual property and represent an important feature of the intellectual property law landscape". The holder of an intellectual property right such as a copyrighted work, a trademark, or a patent, may send the cease and desist letter to inform a third party "of the right holder's rights, identity, and intentions to enforce the rights". The letter may merely contain a licensing offer or may be an explicit threat of a lawsuit. A cease and desist letter often triggers licensing negotiations and is a frequent first step towards litigation.

== Effects on recipients ==
Receiving numerous cease-and-desist letters can be very costly for the recipient. Each claim in the letters must be evaluated, and it should be decided whether to respond to the letters, "whether or not to obtain an attorney's opinion letter, prepare for a lawsuit, and perhaps initiate [in case of letters regarding a potential patent infringement] a search for alternatives and the development of design-around technologies."

Cease and desist letters are sometimes used to intimidate recipients and can be "an effective tool used by corporations to chill the critical speech of gripe sites operators". A company owning a trademark may send such letter to a gripe site operator alleging a trademark infringement, although the actual use of the trademark by the gripe site operator may fall under a fair use exception (in compliance with, in the U.S., the protection of free speech under the First Amendment).

== Notable cease and desist letters ==
=== United States ===
To prevent genericizing and potential loss of its trademark, Google has discouraged use of the word google as a verb, particularly when used as a synonym for general web searching. On 23 February 2003, Google sent a cease and desist letter to Paul McFedries, creator of Word Spy, a website that tracks neologisms. In an article in The Washington Post, Frank Ahrens discussed the letter he received from a Google lawyer that demonstrated "appropriate" and "inappropriate" ways to use the verb google.

Author Patrick Wensink used Jack Daniel's famous branding without licensing as a cover for his 2012 book Broken Piano for President. Jack Daniel's requested only future printings of the book to have the cover changed and offered compensation.

In September 2012, AwardWallet, TripIt and MileWise received a number of cease-and-desist letters from American Airlines, Delta, United Airlines and Southwest Airlines, demanding that the companies discontinue accessing their websites to track clients' miles reward programs.

In 2017, a cease and desist letter sent by Netflix for an unauthorized Stranger Things–related bar event was noted by news outlets such as Fortune and Quartz for its humorous wording.

Donald Trump sent a cease and desist letter to CNN asking them to retract a poll that showed him being 14 percentage points behind his opponent Joe Biden during the 2020 U.S. presidential election, prompting The Atlantic to warn about attacks on the media.

In 2021, Google's platform YouTube issued numerous cease-and-desist notices to creators of various music bots on Discord, such as Rythm and Groovy. These music bots allowed users to request songs and have the bot create a queue. This was done by pulling audio streams from various streaming and video platforms, including YouTube, and then playing them in the Discord voice channel. Because such music bots did not play any of the advertisements on the video-hosting site, the company alleged that it and the content uploaders were missing revenue. A spokesperson for Google told The Verge that Groovy violated YouTube's terms of service for "modifying the service and using it for commercial purposes". The makers of Groovy had decided to comply with Google's request by shutting down the bot on 30 August 2021. According to estimates, the bot had more than 250 million users.

In 2022, Disney issued a letter of cease and desist to the creators of Club Penguin Rewritten, a game that was created as a remake of Club Penguin after its shutdown on 31 March 2017.

Google issued a letter of cease and desist to the creators of YouTube Vanced, an Android app developed as a third-party modification of YouTube. The app, which uses the apk file format, allowed its users to skip advertisements, among other features. Since 13 March 2022, the app has been discontinued, and all links have been removed.

Nintendo issued a letter of cease and desist to the creators of Yuzu, a video game console emulator for the Nintendo Switch. The program allowed its users to not pay or participate in grinding for downloadable content, such as all of its Booster Course Passes and a Gold Mario for Mario Kart 8.

In August 2025, the Roblox Corporation sent a YouTuber known as "Schlep" a cease-and-desist letter for supposedly engaging in vigilantism on their platform in order to catch child predators. Roblox also terminated all of his accounts following the notice.

In December 2025, Disney issued a cease-and-desist letter to Google, alleging widespread copyright infringement. The entertainment giant claims Google’s AI tools, such as Gemini's Nano Banana, Veo, and Imagen, exploit over 200 classic Disney characters for commercial gain without authorization.

In August 2026, X Corp. issued cease-and-desist letters targeting prominent alternative front-ends and mirror sites for the social media platform X that emphasized privacy, including Nitter and XCancel. The letters demanded the permanent closure of these proxy services, as well as various related open-source repositories hosted on GitHub. X Corp. alleged that these entities were illegally scraping data, accessing accounts and session tokens without authorization, thereby violating statutes such as the Lanham Act, the Texas Harmful Access by Computer Act, and Section 1201 of the DMCA.

=== Philippines ===
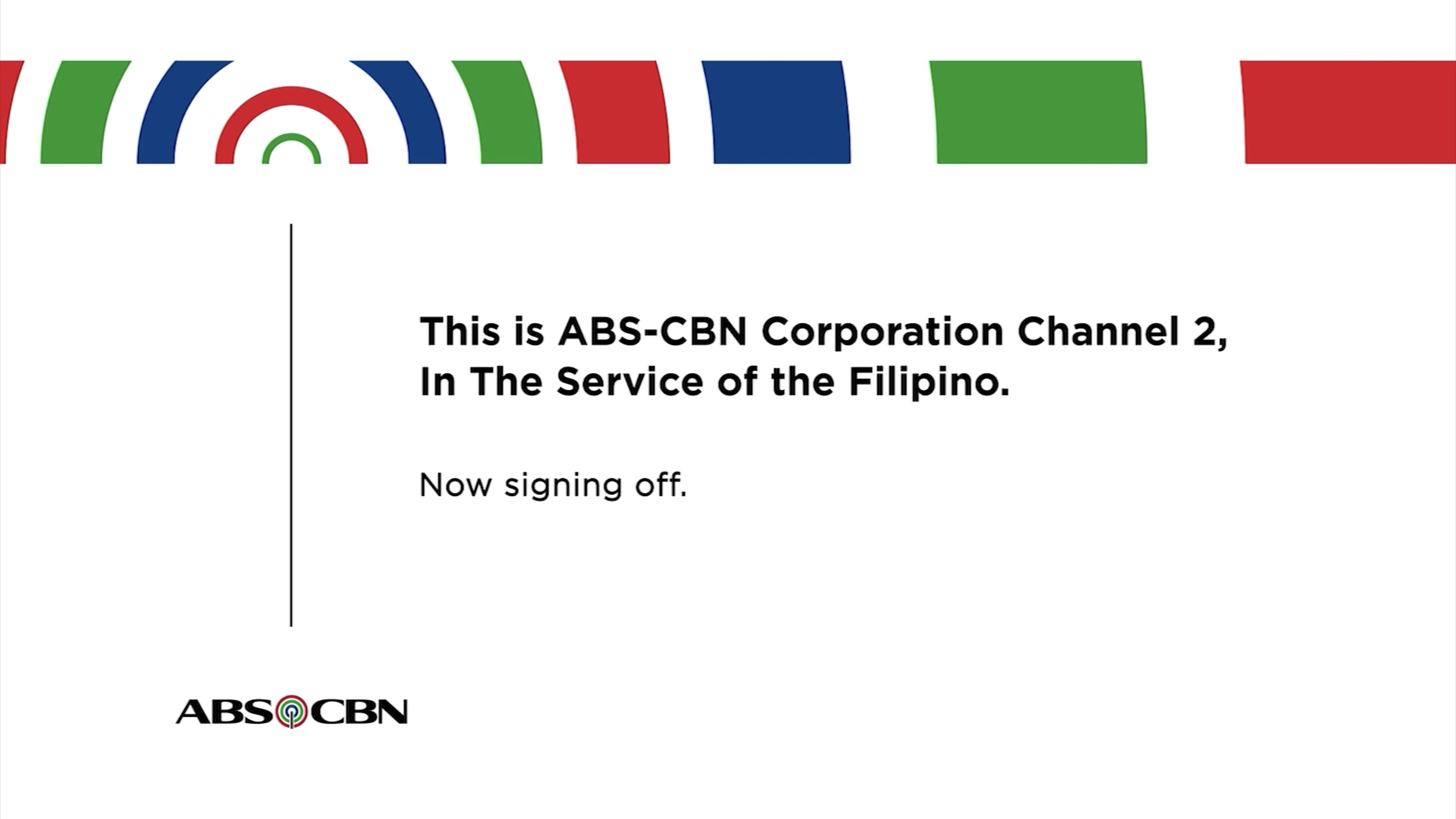
The sign-off message broadcast by DWWX-TV (ABS-CBN Manila) before stopping all broadcasts at 7:52 pm (PST) in compliance with the NTC order because of franchise expiry on 5 May 2020

The Philippine National Telecommunications Commission administered a cease and desist order against ABS-CBN to stop broadcasting on 5 May 2020, after its franchise expired the day before (4 May 2020). At 7:52 pm (PHT), ABS-CBN stopped its broadcast in compliance with the NTC's letter, signing off all of its free TV and radio stations across the country (ABS-CBN Channel 2, S+A Channel 23, DZMM 630, and MOR 101.9). The said agency also gave ABS-CBN ten days to explain why its assigned frequencies should not be recalled. On 30 June 2020, considering that Channel 43 was also included in the 5 May 2020 shutdown order issued by the NTC against ABS-CBN (although ABS-CBN CEO Carlo L. Katigbak insisted that it is part of their blocktime agreement with AMCARA Broadcasting Network), the NTC and Solicitor General Jose Calida released two alias cease-and-desist orders against Channel 43 on digital TV receiver ABS-CBN TV Plus and Sky Cable's nationwide satellite service Sky Direct to cease further operations.

On 22 January 2024, the National Telecommunications Commission issued a cease-and-desist order to Sonshine Media Network International, citing its failure to comply with the original 30-day suspension order issued by the said agency.

== See also ==
- Abmahnung, the equivalent of a cease and desist letter in German and Austrian law
- Lumen (formerly known as Chilling Effects), a collaborative archive to protect lawful online activity from legal threats such as cease and desist letters
- Clameur de haro
- Demand letter
- Legal threat
- Online Copyright Infringement Liability Limitation Act
- Strategic lawsuit against public participation (SLAPP)
- Roblox Schlep ban controversy
