= Youtube-dl =

Video download software

youtube-dl
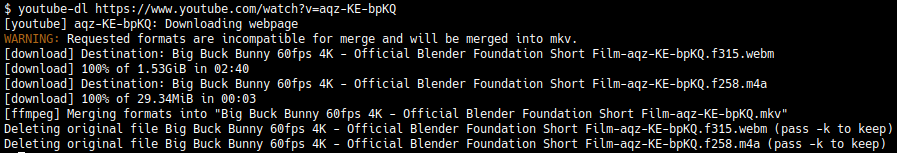
- youtube-dl being used to download Big Buck Bunny from YouTube
- Original author: Ricardo García Gonzalez
- Release: August 8, 2006; 20 years ago
- Stable release: 2021.12.17 / 17 December 2021; 4 years ago
- Preview release: 2025.10.19 / 19 October 2025
- Written in: Python
- Operating system: Windows, macOS, Linux
- Platform: Windows version: IA-32; Others: Same as Python
- Type: Stream recorder
- License: Unlicense
- Website: ytdl-org.github.io/youtube-dl/
- Repository: github.com/ytdl-org/youtube-dl

youtube-dl is a free and open-source software tool for downloading video and audio from YouTube and over 1,000 other video hosting websites. It supports diverse file formats, quality settings, and platforms including Microsoft Windows, macOS, and Linux. It is released under the Unlicense software license.

As of September 2021, youtube-dl is one of the most starred projects on GitHub, with over 100,000 stars. According to libraries.io, 308 other packages and 1,430 repositories depend on it. Numerous forks of the project exist, among which the community-maintained fork yt-dlp is notable for active development and enhanced functionality. yt-dlp builds upon youtube-dl's core features by offering improvements such as faster multi-threaded downloads, more advanced format selection and subtitle embedding support. Due to its active maintenance and expanded capabilities, yt-dlp has been widely adopted and has replaced youtube-dl in several major Linux distributions, notably beginning with Ubuntu 22.04.

Both tools have faced legal challenges, including takedown notices under the Digital Millennium Copyright Act (DMCA), as well as controversies surrounding the downloading of copyrighted content. Nonetheless, they remain important software for users requiring reliable media downloads for purposes including education, archiving, journalism, and fair use.

== History ==
Ricardo Garcia created youtube-dl in 2006. Initially, only YouTube was supported, but as the project grew, it began supporting other video-sharing websites.

Garcia stepped down as maintainer in 2011 and was replaced by Philipp Hagemeister, who later stepped down and was replaced by dstftw. In 2021, dstftw stepped down and was replaced by dirkf.

In 2021, some community members released a fork of youtube-dl, named youtube-dlc (for "community"). By January 2021, the effort was continuing as yt-dlp. yt-dlp was included in Ubuntu as of the 22.04 release. youtube-dl was removed from Debian 12.0 and replaced with an empty package depending on yt-dlp.

In August 2023, German company Uberspace was forced to take down a web domain which they hosted at their premises for the original youtube-dl project, citing a regional German court order issued from Landgericht Hamburg which appeared to ban the mere hosting of information and GitHub developer links related to the cracking of (non-cryptographic) "rolling ciphers." The GitHub subdomain webpage remains in place.

=== RIAA takedown request ===
On October 23, 2020, the Recording Industry Association of America (RIAA) issued a takedown notice to GitHub under the Digital Millennium Copyright Act (DMCA), requesting the removal of youtube-dl and 17 public forks of the project. The RIAA request argued that youtube-dl violates the Section 1201 anti-circumvention provisions of the DMCA, and provisions of German copyright law, since it circumvents a "rolling cipher" used by YouTube to generate the URL for the video file itself (which the RIAA has considered to be an effective technical protection measure, since it is "intended to inhibit direct access to the underlying YouTube video files, thereby preventing or inhibiting the downloading, copying, or distribution of the video files"), and that its documentation expressly encouraged its use with copyrighted media by listing music videos by RIAA-represented artists as examples. GitHub initially complied with the request.

Users criticized the takedown, noting the legitimate uses for the application, including downloading video content released under open licensing schemes or to create derivative works falling under fair use, or other uses such as journalism, archival and law enforcement. Public attention to the takedown resulted in a Streisand effect reminiscent to that of the DeCSS takedown. Users reposted the software's source code across the internet in multiple formats. For example, users posted images on Twitter containing the whole youtube-dl source code encoded in different colors on each pixel. GitHub users also filed pull requests to GitHub's own repository of DMCA takedown notices that included youtube-dl source code.

On November 16, 2020, the repository was reinstated, after the Electronic Frontier Foundation sent GitHub a letter cautioning that its removal might set a precedent for other copyright holders to misuse the notice-and-takedown process to "remove software tools from the Internet based only on the argument that those tools could be used for copyright infringement". Furthermore, the EFF letter asserted that the software was not operating as a "circumvention device", breaching DRM on the video stream, as the stream itself was not encrypted. GitHub also announced that future takedown claims under Section 1201 would be manually scrutinized on a case-by-case basis by legal and technical experts. In response to the saga, the platform launched a fund for providing expert support in writing counter-notifications when contested software was removed, in the hope that this would support fairer outcomes without adding too much friction to the platform's content moderation processes.

== yt-dlp fork ==
yt-dlp

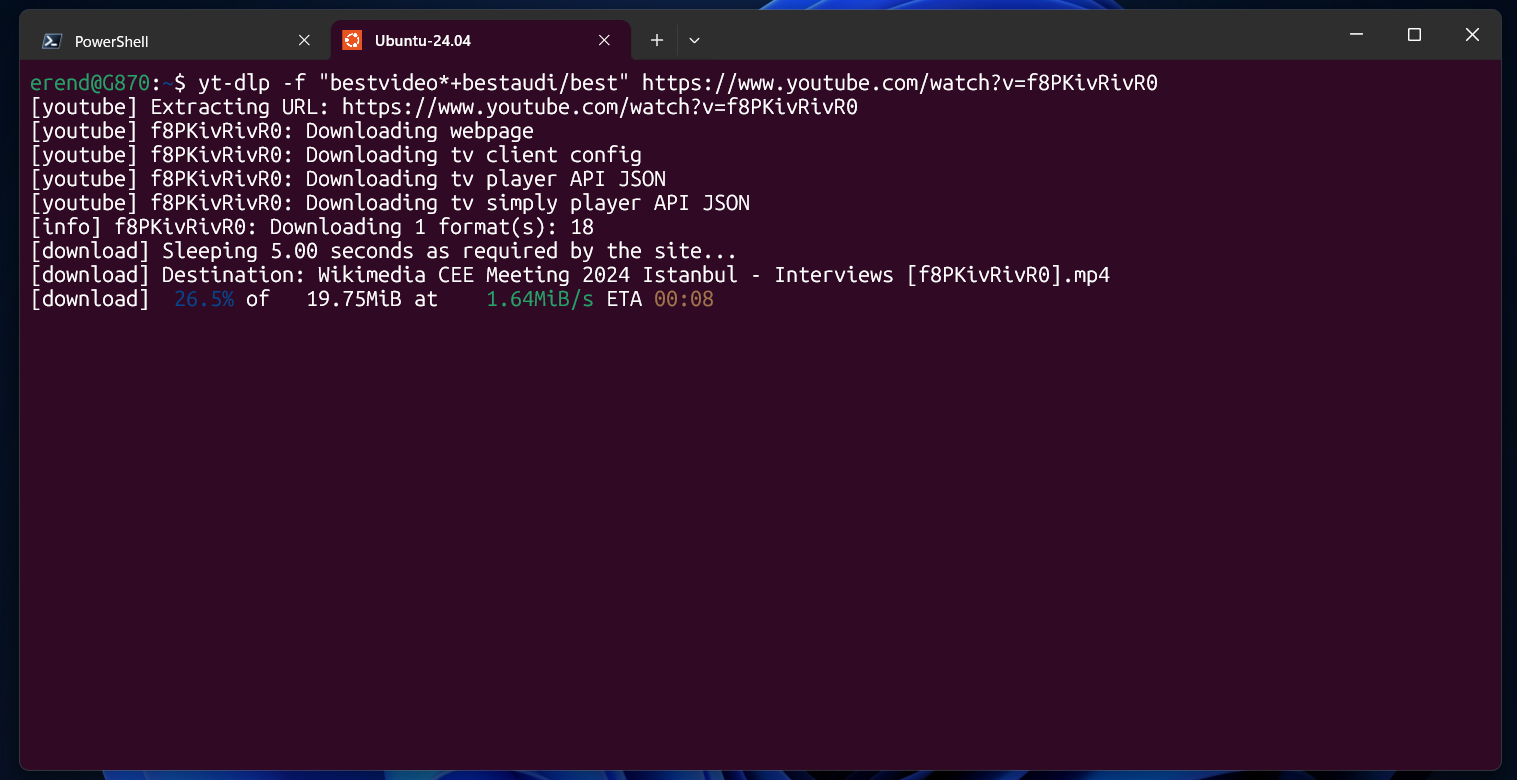
- yt-dlp downloading a video by WMTR, working on WSL
- Release: January 7, 2021
- Stable release: 2026.08.19 / 19 August 2026
- Website: discord.com/invite/H5MNcFW63r
- Repository: github.com/yt-dlp/yt-dlp

In response to development stagnation in youtube-dl, a community fork named yt-dlp emerged, enhancing core features and expanding site support. yt-dlp provides faster downloads, improved format selection, and enhanced extraction logic. The fork is actively maintained, has gained significant adoption, and was included in major Linux distributions such as Ubuntu starting from version 22.04.

== See also ==
- Stream ripping
- YouTube Vanced
