= Privoxy =

Non-caching proxy server

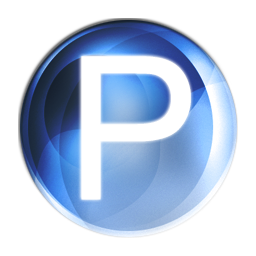
- Developer: Privoxy Developers
- Release: 2001
- Stable release: 4.2.0 (2 June 2026; 5 months ago) [±]
- Preview release: 3.0.25 (July 26, 2016; 10 years ago) [±]
- Written in: C
- Type: Filtering proxy
- License: GNU GPLv2
- Website: www.privoxy.org
- Repository: sourceforge.net/projects/ijbswa/

Privoxy is a free non-caching web proxy with filtering capabilities for enhancing privacy, manipulating cookies and modifying web page data and HTTP headers before the page is rendered by the browser. Privoxy is a "privacy enhancing proxy", filtering web pages and removing advertisements. Privoxy can be customized by users, for both stand-alone systems and multi-user networks. Privoxy can be chained to other proxies and is frequently used in combination with Squid among others and can be used to bypass Internet censorship.

== History ==
Privoxy is based on the Internet Junkbuster and is released under the GNU General Public License. It runs on Linux, OpenWrt, DD-WRT, Windows, macOS, OS/2, AmigaOS, BeOS, and most flavors of Unix. Almost any Web browser can use it. The software is hosted at SourceForge. Historically the Tor Project bundled Privoxy with Tor but this was discontinued in 2010 as they pushed their own internal Tor Browser project and recommended against external third party proxies. Privoxy still works if manually configured and is still recommended for third party non-browser applications which do not natively support SOCKS.

== Reception ==
Shashank Sharma of Linux Format rated it 9/10 stars and wrote, "Privoxy is highly customisable, easy to set up, has good documentation and is fun to work with. Use it!" Erez Zukerman of PC World rated it 4/5 stars and called it complicated but powerful. Michelle Delio of Wired called it "an outstanding way to protect one's privacy".

== See also ==
- Content-control software
- Web accelerator which discusses host-based HTTP acceleration
- Proxy server which discusses client-side proxies
- Reverse proxy which discusses origin-side proxies
- Internet Cache Protocol
- Polipo, a caching web proxy server
- Proxomitron, a similar content-filtering proxy for Windows
