= Corkscrew (program) =

Corkscrew is a computer program, written by Patrick Padgett, that enables the user to tunnel SSH connections through most HTTP and HTTPS proxy servers. Combined with features of SSH such as port forwarding, this can allow many types of services to be run securely over the SSH via HTTP connections.

Supported proxy servers:

- Gauntlet
- CacheFlow
- Internet Junkbuster
- Squid
- Apache's mod_proxy
