= Polipo =

Web proxy server

- The polipo proxy taking requests from an internal network and forwarding them to the Internet.
- Developer: Juliusz Chroboczek
- Final release: 1.1.1 / 14 May 2014; 11 years ago
- Repository: github.com/jech/polipo
- Written in: C
- Operating system: Windows, OS X, Linux, OpenWrt, FreeBSD, OpenBSD
- Type: web cache, proxy server
- License: MIT License (free software)
- Website: www.pps.univ-paris-diderot.fr/~jch/software/polipo/

The LAMP (software bundle) with polipo as lightweight forwarding and caching web proxy server. A high performance and high-availability solution for a hostile environment

Polipo is a discontinued lightweight caching and forwarding web proxy server. It has a wide variety of uses, from aiding security by filtering traffic; to caching web, DNS and other computer network lookups for a group of people sharing network resources; to speeding up a web server by caching repeated requests. It can be configured to use on-disk cache and serve cached content when offline and perform various forms of content filtering.

To minimize latency, Polipo both pipelines multiple resource requests and multiplexes multiple transactions onto the same TCP/IP connection. Polipo is HTTP 1.1-compliant, supports IPv4, IPv6, traffic filtering and privacy-enhancement.

Polipo is free software released under the MIT License.

Polipo ceased to be maintained on 6 November 2016 due to the increasingly widespread use of encryption (i.e. HTTPS) making caching proxies obsolete.

== Design ==
Polipo is designed to be used as a personal web cache or a web cache shared among a few users to boost internet access. Designed to be fast, lightweight and small, it is useful when the system resources for a larger proxy are unavailable. Because of this, it has been put to uses such as a tether on the OpenWrt.

== GUI wrappers ==
Natively, polipo comes as a highly specialized command-line interface (CLI) software application, which requires commands to be typed on the keyboard and parameters stored in configuration text files. Alternatively, polipo allows users to run the program automated and non-interactively, such as in a shell script. By starting a GUI wrapper application users can intuitively interact with polipo, start and stop it and change its working parameters, through graphical icons and visual indicators.

Some independent GUI wrapper projects are:

- Solipo - a GUI wrapper application for polipo on Windows
- Dolipo - a GUI wrapper for OS X
- Polipoid - a wrapper for Android

== Features ==
The fast, lightweight and small memory footprint proxy server polipo uses a variety of techniques:

- Polipo will upgrade client requests to HTTP/1.1 even if they come in as old HTTP/1.0.
- Polipo does HTTP 1.1 pipelining well, so it can enhance internet communication latency.
- Polipo will make web browsing faster or at least appear to have less latency.
- Polipo will cache the initial segment of a download and can complete it later using Range requests, in case of interrupts.
- Polipo can, to some extent, substitute for filtering and privacy-enhancing proxies such as Privoxy or WWWOFFLE, it provides capabilities to block or redirect requests, censor HTTP request headers and referrer information.
- Polipo has complete support for IPv6.
- Since Polipo can speak both IPv4 and IPv6, Polipo can be used as a bridge between the IPv4 and IPv6 Internets.
- Polipo can speak the SOCKS 4 and SOCKS 5 protocols.
- Polipo serves as a web cache.

=== Limitations ===
Polipo is limited to 2G or 4G file sizes on 32 bit systems which will cause errors when serving large requests.

== See also ==
- Web accelerator which discusses host-based HTTP acceleration
- Reverse proxy which discusses origin-side proxies
- Comparison of web servers
- Internet Cache Protocol
- List of TCP and UDP port numbers
