= SquidNT =

Port of the Squid proxy server

- Stable release: 2.7.STABLE8 / 3.0.STABLE25 / March 13, 2010
- Written in: C (programming language)
- Operating system: Microsoft Windows
- Type: web cache, proxy server
- License: GNU General Public License
- Website: http://www.squid-cache.org / Acme Consulting

SquidNT was a port of the Squid proxy server to Microsoft's Windows NT-based operating systems. The SquidNT effort has since then been merged into the main Squid project (September 2006) and is maintained by Guido Serassio, one of the core developers of Squid. The name SquidNT is still often used for referring to Squid running on Windows but is not an official name. The official name is Squid regardless of platform.

You can compile the source code with Minimalist GNU for Windows or Microsoft Visual Studio. But Windows support is still largely missing.

Squid for Windows may be installed and run from the command line. It may also be installed as a Windows service. There is no graphical user interface.

== Compatibility ==
Squid for Windows can run on the following Windows operating systems:

- Microsoft Windows NT 4.0
- Microsoft Windows 2000
- Microsoft Windows XP
- Microsoft Windows Server 2003
- Microsoft Windows Vista
- Microsoft Windows Server 2008
- Microsoft Windows 7
