= HAProxy =

Free and open-source proxy software

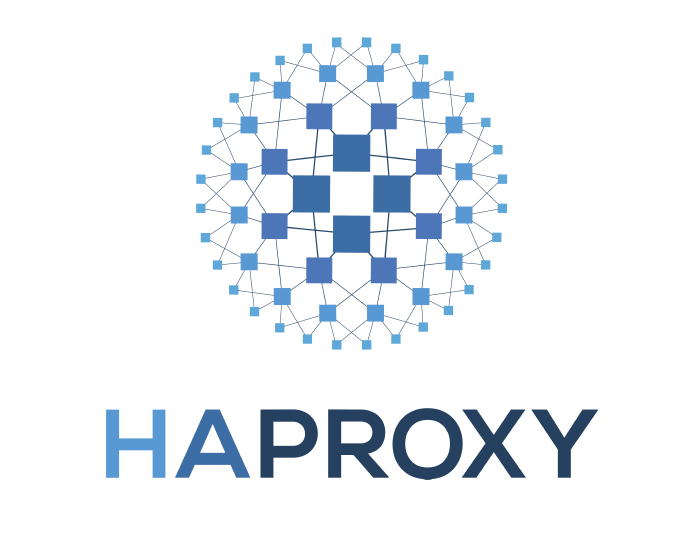
- Original author: Willy Tarreau
- Release: December 16, 2001; 24 years ago
- Stable release: 3.4.3 / 29 July 2026
- Written in: C
- Operating system: Linux, FreeBSD, OpenBSD, Solaris (8/9/10), AIX (5.1–5.3), macOS, Cygwin
- License: GNU General Public License Version 2
- Website: www.haproxy.org
- Repository: github.com/haproxy

HAProxy is a free and open source software that provides a high availability load balancer and proxy (forward proxy, reverse proxy) for TCP and HTTP-based applications that spreads requests across multiple servers. It is written in C and has a reputation for being fast and efficient (in terms of processor and memory usage).

HAProxy is used by a number of high-profile websites including GoDaddy, GitHub, Bitbucket, Stack Overflow, Reddit, Slack, Speedtest.net, Tumblr, Twitter and Tuenti and is used in the OpsWorks product from Amazon Web Services.

== History ==
HAProxy was written in 2000 by Willy Tarreau, a core contributor to the Linux kernel, who still maintains the project.

In 2013, the company HAProxy Technologies, LLC was created. The company provides a commercial offering, HAProxy Enterprise and appliance-based application-delivery controllers named ALOHA.

== Features ==
HAProxy has the following features:

- Layer 4 (TCP) and Layer 7 (HTTP) load balancing
- Multi-factor stickiness
- URL rewriting
- Rate limiting
- SSL/TLS termination proxy
- Gzip compression
- Caching
- PROXY Protocol support
- Scriptable multi-layer Health checking
- Connection and HTTP message logging
- HTTP/2 support on both sides
- HTTP/3 support
- WebSocket (RFC6455 and RFC8441)
- UDP/TCP Syslog load-balancing and forwarding/transcribing (RFC3164 and RFC5424)
- Event-driven Multithreaded architecture
- Hitless reloads
- gRPC Support
- Lua and SPOE Support
- API Support
- Layer 4/7 Retries
- Simplified circuit breaking
- Advanced debugging and tracing facilities
- Distributed stick-tables for stats collection and DoS mitigation

== HAProxy Community vs HAProxy Enterprise ==
HAProxy Enterprise Edition is an enterprise-class version of HAProxy that includes enterprise suite of add-ons, expert support, and professional services. It has some features backported from the HAProxy development branch.

== ALOHA ==
HAProxy Technologies’ ALOHA is a plug-and-play load-balancing appliance that can be deployed in any environment. ALOHA provides a graphical interface and a templating system that can be used to deploy and configure the appliance.

== Versions ==
HAProxy has had the following version releases:

Version	Release date	End of life
1.0	2001-12-16	2001-12-30
1.1	2002-03-10	2006-01-29
1.2	2003-11-09	2011-08-06
1.3	2006-06-29	2016-03-14
1.4	2010-02-26	2018-02-08
1.5	2014-06-19	2020-01-10
1.6	2015-10-13	2020-Q4
1.7	2016-11-25	2021-Q4
1.8	2017-11-26	2022-Q4
1.9	2018-12-19	2020-Q2
2.0	2019-06-16	2024-Q2
2.1	2019-11-25	2021-Q1
2.2 LTS	2020-07-07	2025-Q2
2.3	2020-11-05	2022-Q1
2.4 LTS	2021-05-14	2026-Q2
2.5	2021-11-23	2023-Q1
2.6 LTS	2022-05-31	2027-Q2 (critical fixes only)
2.7	2022-12-01	2024-Q1
2.8 LTS	2023-05-31	2028-Q2 (critical fixes only)
2.9	2023-12-05	2025-Q1
3.0 LTS	2024-05-29	2029-Q2
3.1	2024-11-26	2026-Q1
3.2 LTS	2025-05-28	2030-Q2
3.3	2025-11-26	2027-Q1
3.4 LTS	2026-06-03	2031-Q2
3.5-dev	2026-Q4	2028-Q1
Unsupported Supported Latest version Future version

== Performance ==
Servers equipped with 6 to 8 cores generally achieve between 200,000 and 500,000 requests per second, and have no trouble saturating a 25 Gbit/s connection under Linux. 64-core ARM servers were shown to reach 2 million requests per second and 100 Gbit/s.

== Similar software ==
- Nginx
- Gearman
- Pound
- Vinyl Cache
- Envoy by CNCF

== See also ==
- LAMP, LYME, and LEAP
