= NetJet =

First commercially available web accelerator

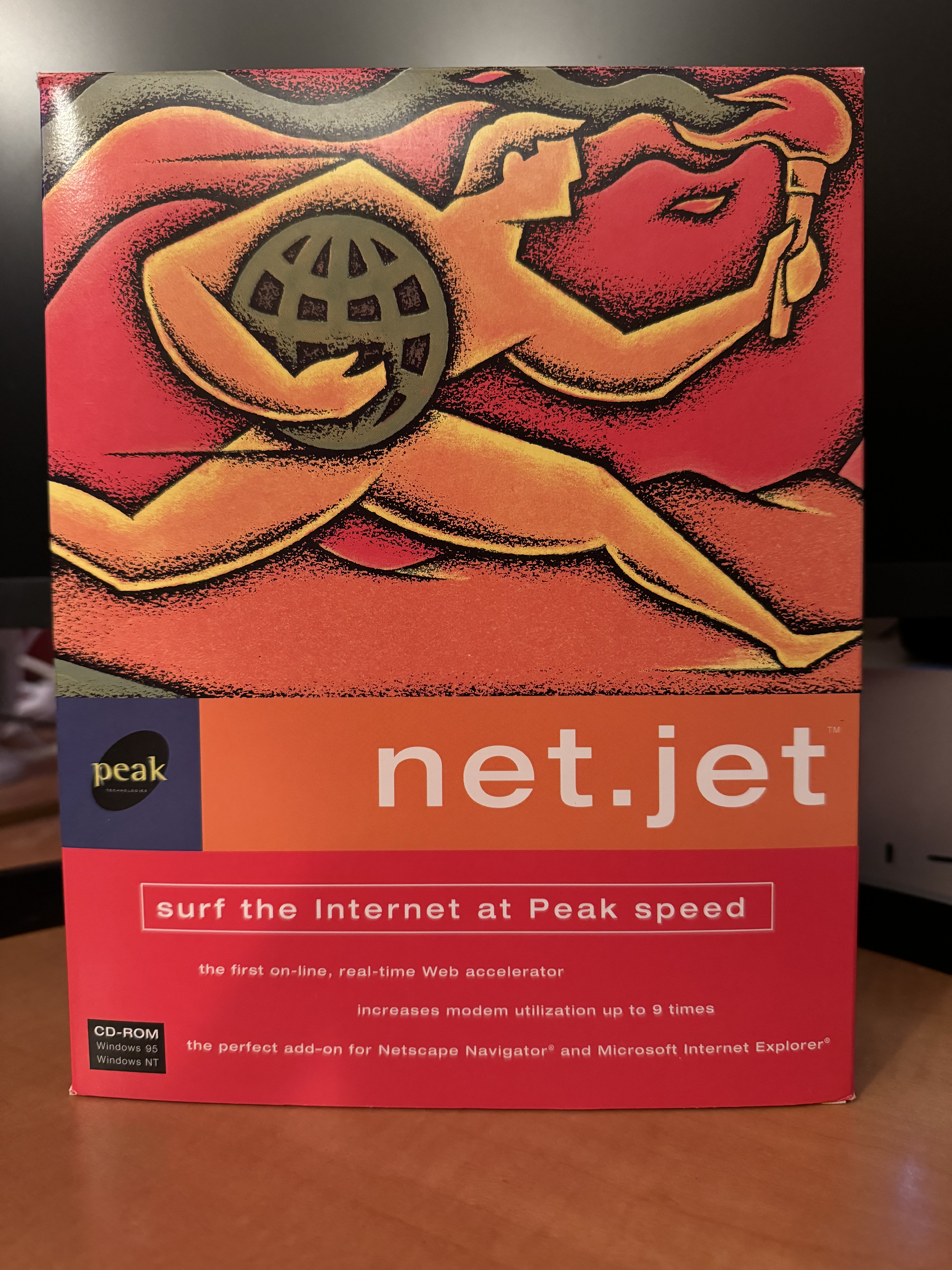
Peak Technologies NetJet

NetJet was the first commercially available web accelerator. The product was developed by Peak Technologies (changed in 1997 to PeakSoft Multinet Corp.) in 1996 and released in November 1996 at COMDEX in Las Vegas, Nevada. NetJet was named a 'Best in Show' product in the internet category.

NetJet was derived from the ExpressO Java Server designed and developed by Charles T. ("Chuck") Russell the founder of Innovative Desktop Inc. a Delaware corporation acquired by Peak Technologies in June, 1996. ExpressO was the first widely distributed, commercially available java application server.

NetJet features provided better response time and enhanced download speeds for web browsers by performing work in the background. NetJet drew interest from the World Wide Web community in December 1996 when CNET magazine wrote: "Web accelerators--one of the hottest tools on the Internet--are supposed to make life easier for Net surfers, but they are causing some headaches for Web site operators." At that time link prefetching was causing a number of HTTP requests to be delivered to each website the browser visited. While this increased browsing speed for the user it did cause web server traffic to be magnified, much to the concern of website administrators.

NetJet paved the way for commercial Java technologies and may be considered notable because of the following:

1. It was the first commercially available, shrink wrapped application written for the Java platform.
2. It was the first software product updated over the air via the internet.
3. It provided the first look ahead technologies to enable link prefetching.
4. It contained intelligent caching algorithms ensuring frequently visited content was fresh and up-to-date.
5. The product was the first software product to provide web update features allowing NetJet updates to be automatically downloaded online and applied to the product without user intervention.

The product acted as a client-side caching web proxy and was compatible with most web browsers. All fetched content was cached and updated within background threads based upon user's browsing habits. The 'smart cache' used several algorithmic tricks to ensure that content users browsed regularly was updated and fresh. This behavior sped up browsing, much of which was done through dial-up modem at speeds of 56 KBS.

Peak Technologies changed the name of the product from NetJet to PeakJet in 1997 after settling a trademark dispute with NetJet inc. (www.netjets.com).

PeakSoft's website was shut down in 2002-2003.
