= Ziproxy =

HTTP proxy server targeted for traffic optimization

- Stable release: 3.3.2 / March 19, 2021
- Repository: svn.code.sf.net/p/ziproxy/code/
- Operating system: Unix-like
- Type: Proxy server
- License: GNU General Public License
- Website: ziproxy.sourceforge.net

A forward proxy taking requests from an internal network and forwarding them to the Internet. Those on the internal network may not have a direct connection to the Internet.

Ziproxy is a forwarding, non-caching, compressing, HTTP proxy server targeted for traffic optimization. The ziproxy software is regarded as lightweight in terms of memory and processing power consumption.

This software works by recompressing pictures (such as JPEG, GIF, PNG, JPEG 2000), gzipping text and HTML/JS/CSS data optimization. Additionally it offers latency reduction by preemptive name resolution.

Further functionalities of compression are supplied by means of optimization of code, named HTMLopt, CSSopt and JSopt (HTML/CSS/JS) which are analogous with Minification (programming).

Currently there are ports being maintained by third parties for Debian, Gentoo Linux, FreeBSD, and OpenBSD.

== See also ==
- Bandwidth management for measuring and controlling the communications (traffic, packets) on a network link
- Comparison of web servers
- Proxy server which discusses client-side proxies
- Reverse proxy which discusses origin-side proxies
- Web accelerator which discusses host-based HTTP acceleration
