= Internet Junkbuster =

- Original author: Junkbusters Corporation
- Type: Filtering proxy
- License: GNU General Public License
- Website: http://internet.junkbuster.com/

The Internet Junkbuster is a web proxy that can block ads, cookies, and other unwanted content from web traffic. It was developed by the Junkbusters Corporation and released under the GNU General Public License (GPL). It was developed mainly during the late 1990s. it functioned by checking requested URLs, including those for images, against a blocklist. The last official release of Internet Junkbuster was version 2.0.2, released in 1998. As it was released under the GPL, the source code could legally be copied, modified, and redistributed by others.

After 1998, some developers maintained and patched Junkbuster's code to add small improvements, including simple additional filtering like banner image replacements and basic pop‑up blocking. This effort resulted in a minor build known as version 2.0.2‑10 around the year 2000. However, the original project itself did not see further official updates, and the original Junkbusters website is no longer maintained.

As Junkbuster's codebase was released under an open‑source license, other developers were able to build a successor project. This led to the creation of Privoxy, a more advanced web proxy that expanded filtering capabilities, added configuration flexibility, and improved support for modern web protocols. Privoxy's first stable release (version 3.0) was released in August 2002, and it continues to be actively maintained by volunteer developers.

== Guidescope and Related Projects ==
Junkbuster's developers also released Guidescope, a consumer-oriented version of Junkbuster, which is no longer actively developed.

== Reception ==
A review by InfoWorld in 2000 gave it a score of "Good" but criticized it for the technical knowledge needed to modify the blocklist by manually editing a .ini file.

== See also ==
- Proxomitron
