= Poul-Henning Kamp =

Danish software developer

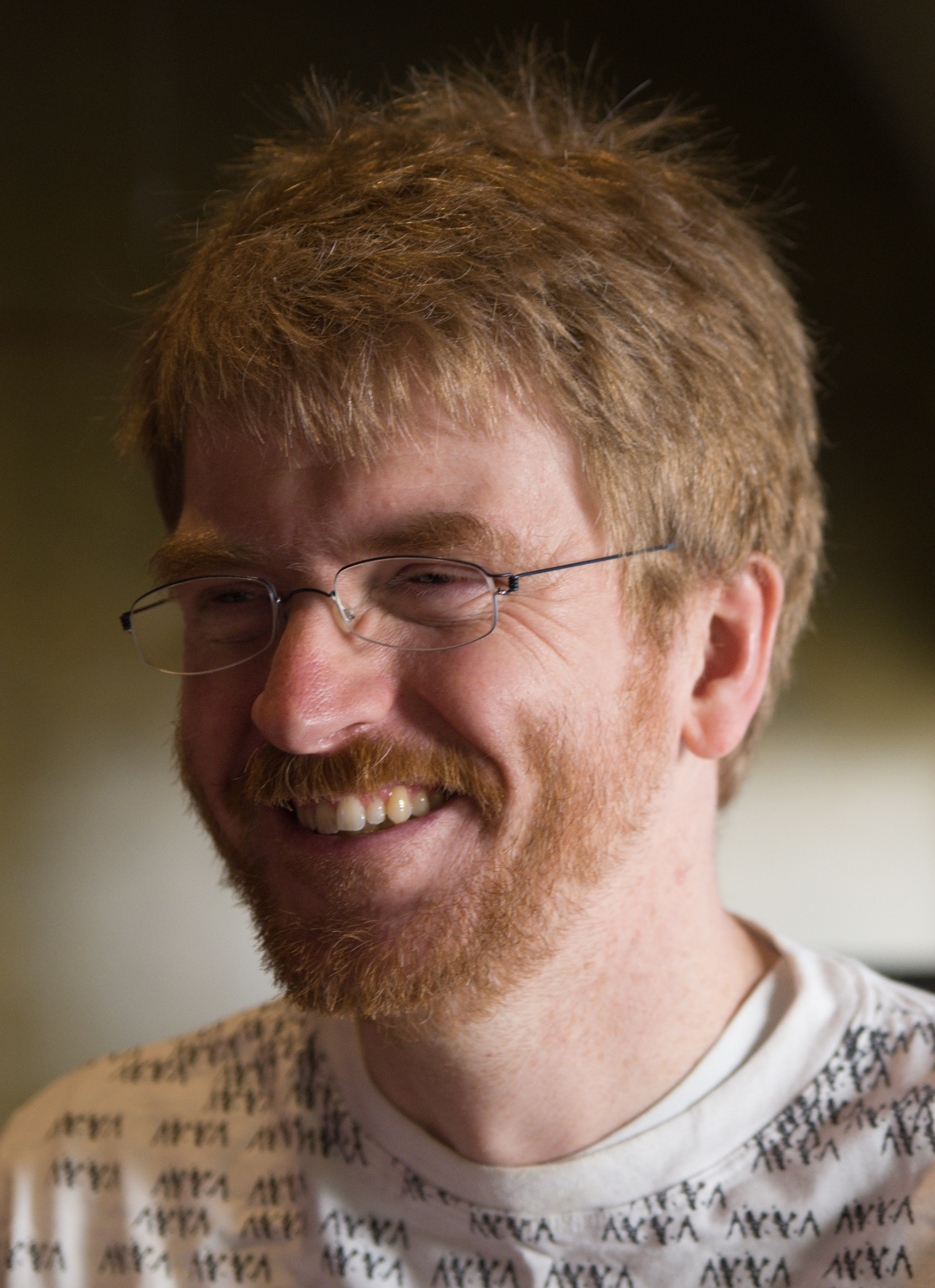
- Kamp in 2013
- Other name: phk
- Occupation: Programmer
- Employer: Self-employed
- Known for: various contributions to FreeBSD and Vinyl Cache

Poul-Henning Kamp (Danish: [ˈpʰʌwl ˈhene̝ŋ ˈkʰɑmˀp]) is a Danish computer software developer known for work on various projects including FreeBSD and Vinyl Cache. He currently resides in Slagelse, Denmark.

== Involvement in the FreeBSD project ==
Poul-Henning Kamp has been committing to the FreeBSD project for most of its duration. He is responsible for the widely used MD5crypt implementation of the MD5-based password hash algorithm, a vast quantity of systems code including the FreeBSD GEOM storage layer, GBDE cryptographic storage transform, part of the UFS2 file system implementation, FreeBSD Jails, the phkmalloc implementation of the malloc library call, and the FreeBSD and NTP timecounters code, and the nanokernel interface with David Mills.

== Vinyl Cache ==
He is the lead architect and developer for the open source Vinyl Cache project (formerly Varnish Cache), an HTTP accelerator.

== Dispute with D-Link ==
In 2006, Kamp had a dispute with electronics manufacturer D-Link in which he claimed they were committing NTP vandalism by embedding the IP address of his NTP servers in their routers. The dispute was resolved in April 2006.

== Beerware ==
Beerware
- Author: Poul-Henning Kamp
- Latest version: 42
- Publisher: Yes
- Published: 1998 (Note: According to the Wayback Machine, the earliest revision of Poul-Henning Kamp's website containing the license is 1998. It is unknown whether this was indeed the first year of the license's publication.)
- Debian FSG compatible: Yes
- FSF approved: Yes (see "informal license" section)
- OSI approved: No
- GPL compatible: Yes
- Copyleft: No
- Linking from code with a different license: Yes
- Website: people.freebsd.org/~phk/

Beerware is a tongue-in-cheek software license with permissive terms, which grants the user the rights to do anything with the source code, including editing and distributing, so long as the license notice is preserved. The informal wording has been criticized as creating substantial legal ambiguity for its users.

Should the user of the code consider the software useful, they are encouraged to buy the author a beer "in return" if they ever meet. The Humanitarian-FOSS project at Trinity College recognized the "version 42" beerware license variant as an extremely permissive "copyright only" and GPL-compatible license. According to the Free Software Foundation, the license would be classified as an "informal" free, non-copyleft and GPL-compatible license, however more detailed licenses are recommended. As of October 2025, Beerware hasn't been approved by the Open Source Initiative (OSI).

Kamp states his preference of his Beerware license over other licenses, such as BSD and GPL, the latter of which he has described as a "joke". The full text of Kamp's license is:

/*
 * ----------------------------------------------------------------------------
 * "THE BEER-WARE LICENSE" (Revision 42):
 * <phk@FreeBSD.ORG> wrote this file. As long as you retain this notice you
 * can do whatever you want with this stuff. If we meet some day, and you think
 * this stuff is worth it, you can buy me a beer in return Poul-Henning Kamp
 * ----------------------------------------------------------------------------
 */

== Bike shed discussion ==
FOSDEM 2014: "NSA operation ORCHESTRA Annual Status Report" by Kamp

A post by Kamp on the FreeBSD mailing lists is responsible for the popularization of the term bike shed discussion, and the derived term bikeshedding, to describe Parkinson's law of triviality in open source projects – when the amount of discussion that a subject receives is inversely proportional to its importance.

== Publications ==
Poul-Henning Kamp has published a substantial number of articles over the years in publications like Communications of the ACM and ACM Queue mostly on the topics of computing and time keeping. A selection of publications:

- USENIX ATC 1998 FREENIX track, "malloc(3) Revisited"
- USENIX BSDCon 2003, GBDE-GEOM Based Disk Encryption
- USENIX BSDCon 2002, Rethinking /dev and devices in the UNIX kernel
- ACM Queue: Building Systems to be Shared Securely
- ACM Queue: You're doing it wrong
- ACM Queue: A Generation Lost in the Bazaar
- Communications of the ACM 2011: The Most Expensive One-Byte Mistake
- Communications of the ACM 2011: The One-Second War

== See also ==
- 0BSD a public domain equivalent license used by Toybox and explicitly allowed for Android
- Anti-copyright license
- Careware
- Comparison of free and open-source software licenses
- Donationware
- WTFPL
