= X-Originating-IP =

De facto technical standard for email

X-Originating-IP is a de facto standard email header field for identifying the originating IP address of a client connecting to a mail service's HTTP frontend. When clients connect directly to a mail server, its address is already known to the server, but web frontends act as a proxy which internally connect to the mail server. This header can therefore serve to identify the original sender address despite the frontend.

== Format ==
The general format of the field is:

X-Originating-IP: [198.51.100.1]

== Origins ==
In 1999 Hotmail included an X-Originating-IP email header field that shows the IP address of the sender. As of December 2012, Hotmail removed this header field, replacing it with X-EIP (meaning encoded IP) with the stated goal of protecting users' privacy.

== See also ==
- Internet privacy
- List of proxy software
- X-Forwarded-For
