= FreeProxy =

FreeProxy Internet Suite
- Developer: Hand-Crafted Software
- Initial release: 1999
- Written in: C, Visual Basic
- Platform: Windows 32-bit
- Available in: En
- Type: Filtering proxy
- License: Freeware
- Website: http://www.handcraftedsoftware.org

FreeProxy, which runs on Microsoft Windows platforms, was originally developed in 1999 as a method of internet connection sharing. Since that time it has been continuously developed and now offers a number of internet services. The software is free but not available under the GNU General Public License

== Protocols ==
Services roughly divide into Proxy related services and Internet Server related services. Proxy services include HTTP, SMTP, POP3, SOCKS, FTP and a generalized TCP tunnel. The server services include a Web server (HTTP and HTTPS), SMTP with extensions and POP3. ISAPI plugins are accepted allowing for server side scripting such as PHP to be processed by the web server.

== General features ==
FreeProxy offers NTLM, Basic and Digest authentication for HTTP. Ban lists or Whitelists can be imported, URL filtering can be defined, Caching and logging can be configured.

== Community acceptance ==
FreeProxy has a verifiable download count of over 500,000 however it is likely that the count is much higher with it being listed on many hundreds of download sites. It is used predominantly by home and small business users however companies and organizations of up to 200 users are not uncommon. Its features make it ideal for use with other products requiring a stable http proxy platform. Reviews are generally very favorable and it was voted Best of 2007 by PC Magazine in the Networking & Mobility category. Also referenced in Fox News' Cheapskate Guide.

== See also ==
- Content-control software
- Proxy server
