= Internet Cache Protocol =

The Internet Cache Protocol (ICP) is a UDP-based protocol used for coordinating web caches. Its purpose is to find out the most appropriate location to retrieve a requested object in the situation where multiple caches are in use at a single site. The function of ICP is to use the caches as efficiently as possible, and to minimize the number of remote requests to the originating server.

== Operation ==
Hierarchically, a queried cache can either be a parent or a sibling.

Parents usually sit closer to the internet connection than the child. If a child cache cannot find an object, the query usually will be sent to the parent cache, which will fetch, cache, and pass on the request. Siblings are caches of equal hierarchical status, whose purpose is to distribute the load amongst the siblings.

When a request comes into one cache in a cluster of siblings, ICP is used to query the siblings for the object being requested. If the sibling has the object, it will usually be transferred from there, instead of being queried from the original server. This is often called a "near miss" — the object is not found in the cache (a “miss”) but is loaded from a nearby cache, instead of from a remote server.

The ICP protocol was designed to be lightweight in order to minimize round-trip time between caches. It is intended for unreliable but quick connections. This approach can reduce numbers of server retrievals, and also prevent the storage of multiple copies of an instance of data, but leads to the potential drawback of increased intercache communication, which can slow the system down.

The ICP protocol is described in RFC 2186, its application to hierarchical web caching in RFC 2187.

== Proxies ==
Web proxies that support ICP include:

- Cisco CacheEngine
- Cisco Content Engine
- DeleGate
- Harvest project
- Traffic Server
- Mirror Image
- MOWS
- NetCache
- Netscape Proxy Server
- Novell BorderManager FastCache
- ProxySG
- Squid
- SkyCache

HTCP, designed as a successor to ICP, attempts to handle various problems found in ICP deployments.

== ICP message structure ==
An ICP message consists of two sections:

- Header
- Data

Header: Header length is fixed to 20 octets (five 32-bit words).

Data: Data is of variable length, limited by the maximum ICP message size (including header) of 16,384 octets.

The ICP header consists of 8 fields, with 2 optional fields. The fifth and sixth field is optional (pink background in table) and appropriately named “options” and “option data”.

ICP Header
Bit offset	Bits 0–7	8–15	16–31
0	Opcode	Version	Message Length
32	Request number		
64	Options		
96	Option Data		
128	Sender Host Address		
160+	Data		
