= OnSpeed =

Web accelerator service

Onspeed (stylised as ONSPEED) was a web accelerator service designed to accelerate an internet connection using compression techniques.

Onspeed primarily improves the speed of an internet connection, including dial-up, wireless, low-speed broadband, and mobile connections such as 3G, GPRS and UMTS. The Onspeed software is installed onto the user's hard drive and using the existing Internet service provider (ISP) connection to the internet, it utilises data compression techniques to process a website, before it is transmitted by the user's ISP to their computer.

The Onspeed software works by compressing text and graphics contained on any website (or within emails). Each internet access is routed through their UK, United States, South Africa and Indian based servers, which then compress the data before transmitting them to a computer.

Onspeed has dedicated algorithms for compressing the following web page elements (all protected by 9 pending patents): Photo-realistic images (e.g., JPEG, PNG, GIF, and BMP), Line Art and Drawings (e.g., GIF, BMP), Animated objects (GIF), HTML objects, Text, Office Documents (Word, Excel, PowerPoint), PDF Documents, and Macromedia Flash. It does not accelerate secure websites or certain files such as music and video files (MP3, AVI etc.).

== Onspeed Mobile ==
Onspeed also provides a service for mobile phone users using a GPRS/UMTS connection. Operating in a similar way to its PC service, it accelerates and resizes most websites so they can be viewed easily on a mobile phone.

== Proxies ==
AOL customers often experience problems with the service due to AOL's proxy settings. However, Onspeed's website states that AOL customers may still use the service providing they use an alternative browser such as Mozilla Firefox.

Onspeed claims that the software can be used in any country worldwide, however this is not entirely true. Onspeed usually will not work in certain African and Middle Eastern countries that connect to the Internet via a forced proxy.
