= WWWOFFLE =

- Original author: Andrew M. Bishop
- Stable release: 2.9j / March 23, 2016
- License: GNU General Public License
- Website: www.gedanken.org.uk/software/wwwoffle/

WWWOFFLE is a proxy server and web caching software, allowing dial-up or broadband users to cache data for offline use. It can handle HTTP, FTP, and finger protocol, and operates on IPv4 and IPv6. Version builds are Unix-based: ports are available for Linux, and Win32 support is provided via Cygwin.
