= AiScaler =

Multinational software company

aiScaler Ltd
- Company type: Limited company
- Industry: Application Delivery Controller
- Founded: 2008
- Headquarters: Dublin, Ireland
- Key people: Jonathon Erington, Mericot Jennings
- Products: Proxy Server, HTTP accelerator, Web cache, DDoS mitigation
- Website: aiscaler.com

aiScaler Ltd. is a multinational software company founded in 2008. It develops application delivery controllers designed to allow dynamic web pages to scale content by intelligently caching frequently requested content. A number of websites in the Alexa top 1,000 use aiScaler to manage their traffic.

aiScaler software can be deployed either on public cloud computing platforms such as Amazon Web Services or private virtual environments. aiScaler software is considered an edge device as it proxies traffic, augmenting or replacing content delivery networks endpoints.

== History ==
aiScaler started as a project in 1994 by the web development company WBS. The project was called "Jxel", short for Java Accelerator. The technology was Java-based and intended to be run on a Java Virtual Machine sharing the same computer system as the HTTP server. It was re-written in 2009 using the C computer language, occupying its own dedicated server. The new software was rewritten to run on Linux only, taking advantage of changes in the input/output model based on epoll. In July 2008, aiScaler Ltd acquired all technology of WBS for $3.8 million.

Until 2013, aiScaler was known as "aiCache", producing a product called aiScaler. The company took over the name of its main product, phasing out the brand name aiCache.

== Products ==
All aiScaler products can be categorized as Application Delivery Controllers

- aiScaler is an HTTP accelerator that provides application delivery control, in addition to scaling and acceleration of content delivery
- aiProtect offers protection against DDoS attacks and SQL injections
- aiMobile is a Mobile content management system
- aiCDN is a cloud-based Application Delivery Network that allows scaling of dynamic web applications.
- aiScaler and Dell offer a hardware Application Delivery Controller, which fits in a standard rack unit server rack.

aiScaler is based on epoll technology allowing it to employ a right-threaded (only the specified number of workers process requests, no matter how many clients are connected), non-blocking, multiplexed IO design.
