= Harvest project =

Web cache research project

Harvest was a DARPA funded research project by the Internet Research Task Force Research Group on Resource Discovery and hosted at the University of Colorado at Boulder, which provided a web cache, developed standards such as the Internet Cache Protocol and Summary Object Interchange Format, and spawned many other technologies and software products.

After the conclusion of the project in 1996, the development of the Harvest object cache was continued with the University of Edinburgh releasing version 1.5. The open source squid cache and commercial NetCache were both based on the Harvest object cache.
