= PlayStation system software =

PlayStation system software may refer to:

- PlayStation 3 system software
- PlayStation 4 system software
- PlayStation 5 system software
