= Apache Traffic Server =

Open-source proxy server

- Developer: Apache Software Foundation
Stable release
- 10.x: 10.2.1 / 20 October 2026; 7 days ago
- Written in: C++
- Operating system: Cross-platform
- Available in: English
- Type: Web cache, Proxy server
- License: Apache License 2.0
- Website: trafficserver.apache.org
- Repository: Traffic Server Repository

Apache Traffic Server (ATS) is a modular, high-performance reverse proxy and forward proxy server, generally comparable to Nginx and Squid. It was created by Inktomi, and distributed as a commercial product called the Inktomi Traffic Server, before Inktomi was acquired by Yahoo!.

Shortly after Yahoo! released the TS source to Apache as an Apache Incubator project in July 2009, a guest editor on Yahoo!'s online publication OStatic stated that Yahoo! uses TS in production to serve more than 30 billion objects per day on sites like the Yahoo! homepage, and Yahoo! Sports, Mail and Finance.

On April 21, 2010, the Apache board accepted Traffic Server as a TLP, graduating the project out of incubation.

== Current version ==
The latest stable version is 10.2.1 and was released on 20 October 2026. The latest long-term support version is and was released on .

As of June 2021, ATS is released in two stable versions, Version 8 is a long-term support version of ATS while version 9 is the latest stable release, with quarterly minor versions scheduled. Beginning with version 4.0, all releases are considered stable for production, and follow regular semantic versioning. No more developer preview releases will be made, instead, the Git master branch is considered preview quality at all times. Long-term support is provided for the last minor version within a major release, for one added year.

ATS has good support for the next generation HTTP protocol as of v6.0.0, HTTP/2 (a.k.a. H2). On the Is TLS Fast Yet site, it scores 100%. ATS is actively developed and supported by several large companies, as well as many individual contributors.

== Features and performance ==
The OStatic post describes TS as shipping "... with not only an HTTP web proxy and caching solution, but also ... a server framework, with which you can build very fast servers for other protocols". Traffic Server has been benchmarked to handle 200,000 requests per second or more (small objects out of cache). At a talk at the 2009 Cloud Computing Expo, members of the Yahoo! TS team stated that TS is used in production at Yahoo! to handle 400TB of traffic per day using only 150 commodity machines. The OStatic post describes TS as the "product of literally hundreds of developer-years".

== Deployment ==
In the context of cloud computing, TS would sit conceptually at the edge of the cloud, routing requests as they come in. In Yahoo!, it is used for the edge services as shown in a graphic distributed at the 2009 Cloud Computing Expo depicting Yahoo!'s private cloud architecture. In practical terms, a typical server configuration might use TS to serve static content, such as images, JavaScript, Cascading Style Sheets (CSS), and HyperText Markup Language (HTML) files, and route requests for dynamic content to a web server such as Apache HTTP Server.
