= NetCache =

Web cache software

- Original author: NetApp
- Final release: 6.0.7
- Platform: Cross platform; Data ONTAP
- Type: web cache

NetCache is a former web cache software product which was owned and developed by NetApp between 1997 and 2006, and a hardware product family incorporating the NetCache software.

== History ==
The NetCache software started as a commercial fork of the Harvest Object Cache developed by Internet Middleware Corporation (IMC), which consisted of former Harvest project developers including Peter B. Danzig, a professor at University of Southern California. In late 1996 the software was named Internet Middleware Object Cache, and it was referred to as Cached 2 and later Cached 3.

In 1997 IMC was acquired by NetApp, and the software was renamed NetCache, with Danzig becoming chief architect and CTO of NetCache division.

In 2006 NetApp sold the NetCache business (but not technology) to Blue Coat Systems, who had a similar line of ProxySG appliances which became the more expensive product for existing NetApp customers.

== Hardware appliance ==
The hardware NetCache appliance included the NetApp Data ONTAP microkernel, with its Write Anywhere File Layout file system, achieving four times the throughput as software equivalents available at time, according to NetApp comparisons. Starting with ONTAP version 9.5 similar functionality was introduced under FlexCache name.

=== Models ===
As of November 2005, three hardware models were being offered:

- C1300 - Lowest cost device. Small form factor chassis. Targeted at branch and small offices.
- C2300 - Mid range device. Targeted at larger office environments.
- C3300 - High end device. Targeted for use in company headquarters, datacentres and ISPs. Storage capacity of up to 2.4TB.

Former models include:

- C1200 - Replaced by the C1300 in 2005.
- C6200 - High Performance device. Phased out in 2005.
