= Web cache =

System for optimizing the Web

A web cache (or HTTP cache) is a system for optimizing the World Wide Web. It is implemented both client-side and server-side. The caching of multimedia and other files can result in less overall delay when browsing the Web. In 2000, computer scientists Jim Gray and Prashant Shenoy calculated that for web page caching, a web browser should "cache web pages if there is any chance they will be re-referenced within their lifetime."

== Parts of the system ==
=== Forward and reverse ===
A forward cache is a cache outside the web server's network, e.g. in the client's web browser, in an Internet service provider, or within a corporate network. A network-aware forward cache only caches heavily accessed items. A proxy server sitting between the client and web server can evaluate HTTP headers and choose whether to store web content.

A reverse cache sits in front of one or more web servers, accelerating requests from the Internet and reducing peak server load. This is usually a content delivery network (CDN) that retains copies of web content at various points throughout a network.

=== HTTP options ===
The Hypertext Transfer Protocol (HTTP) defines three basic mechanisms for controlling caches: freshness, validation, and invalidation. This is specified in the header of HTTP response messages from the server.

Freshness allows a response to be used without re-checking it on the origin server, and can be controlled by both the server and the client. For example, the Expires response header gives a date when the document becomes stale, and the Cache-Control: max-age directive tells the cache how many seconds the response is fresh for.

Validation can be used to check whether a cached response is still good after it becomes stale. For example, if the response has a Last-Modified header, a cache can make a conditional request using the If-Modified-Since header to see if it has changed. The ETag (entity tag) mechanism also allows for both strong and weak validation.

Invalidation is usually a side effect of another request that passes through the cache. For example, if a URL associated with a cached response subsequently gets a POST, PUT or DELETE request, the cached response will be invalidated. Many CDNs and manufacturers of network equipment have replaced this standard HTTP cache control with dynamic caching.

== Legality ==
In 1998, the Digital Millennium Copyright Act added rules to the United States Code (17 U.S.C. §: 512) that exempts system operators from copyright liability for the purposes of caching.

== Server-side software ==
This is a list of server-side web caching software.

Name	Operating system			Forward mode	Reverse mode	License
Name	Windows	Unix-like	Other	Forward mode	Reverse mode	License
Apache HTTP Server	Yes	OS X, Linux, Unix, FreeBSD, Solaris, Novell NetWare	OS/2, TPF, OpenVMS, eComStation	Yes		Apache 2.0
aiScaler Dynamic Cache Control	No	Linux	No			Proprietary
ApplianSys CACHEbox	No	Linux	No			Proprietary
Blue Coat ProxySG	No	No	SGOS	Yes	Yes	Proprietary
nginx	Yes	Linux, BSD, OS X, Solaris, AIX, HP-UX	Yes	Yes	Yes	2-clause BSD-like
Microsoft Forefront Threat Management Gateway	Yes	No	No	Yes	Yes	Proprietary
Polipo	Yes	OS X, Linux, OpenWrt, FreeBSD	?	Yes	Yes	MIT License
Squid	Yes	Linux	?	Yes	Yes	GPL
Apache Traffic Server	?	Linux	?	Yes	Yes	Apache 2.0
Untangle	No	Linux	No	Yes	Yes	Proprietary
Varnish	No	Linux	No	Needs a VMOD	Yes	BSD
WinGate	Yes	No	No	Yes	Yes	Proprietary (Free for 8 users)
Nuster	No	Linux	No	Yes	Yes	GPL
McAfee Web Gateway	No	McAfee Linux Operating System	No	Yes	Yes	Proprietary

== See also ==
- InterPlanetary File System - makes web caches redundant
- Cache Discovery Protocol
- Cache manifest in HTML5
- Content delivery network
- Harvest project
- Proxy server
- Web accelerator
- Search engine cache
- Temporary Internet Files
