= The Internet Hunt =

Monthly online game and search training tool

The Internet Hunt was a monthly online game and search training tool, conceived and conducted by Rick Gates, as Director of Library Automation UC Santa Barbara, which began 31 August 1992, before the World Wide Web. Gates studied at the Graduate Library School at the University of Arizona and later developed the concept of Interpedia, a precursor to Wikipedia.

Most Internet Hunts were composed of ten questions that Gates had verified could be answered with Internet sources exclusively, and tools of that time, such as Usenet, Telnet, FTP, and, Archie, Jughead, Veronica, and Gopher. The first individual or team to answer all ten questions correctly and provide the method used to answer them was declared the winner(s).

The Internet Hunt ran from Aug 1992 to 1995. It was mentioned in a book, on a website, and on LISTSERVs.
