= AlienBabelTech =

AlienBabelTech started out as an international collaboration of computer enthusiasts and professionals. It is an online computer and technology-related publication website that was officially launched on 1 October 2008.

== Purpose ==
AlienBabelTech is an online information technology resource.

== Forums ==
The AlienBabelTech forums currently has over 1000 registered users and over 55,000 posts. According to Alexa statistics, ABT, as it is known for short, has over 400 other sites linking in.
