= Mediapolis (company) =

American web engineering company

Mediapolis, Inc.
- Type: Private
- Industry: Web engineering
- Founded: January 1995; 31 years ago
- Founder: Carl Pritzkat, Michael Rhodes, Tony Travostino
- Headquarters: New York City, New York, U.S.
- Website: mediapolis.com

Mediapolis, Inc. is a Web engineering company based in New York City. Founded in 1995, the company has built over 300 websites largely utilizing open-source software.

Mediapolis owns and operates the DataLounge, a popular gay Internet forum.

== History ==
The company, originally founded in January 1995 by Carl Pritzkat, Michael Rhodes, and Tony Travostino. The first headquarters were out of Michael's apartment in the Meatpacking District, Manhattan. In 1998 Alan Emtage, creator of Archie, the first Internet search engine, joined the company. Since then it has worked to produce several hundred websites, with clients ranging from small nonprofits to large multi-national corporations.

For a period the company operated a string of gay sites under the moniker 'The Datalounge Network'. These included HomoRama.com, Gayvote.com, GayHealth.com, SouthernVoice.com and HoustonVoice.com.

In January 1995, BMG Entertainment launched the Internet's first e-commerce site featuring an entire record label catalog, ecmrecords.com, which Mediapolis engineered and operated until late 2004. Other notable sites created and operated include yourpharmacy.com for Express Scripts, grandparents.com, and VolvoForLifeAwards.com for Volvo. In early 2010, Mediapolis was part of a team that purchased Publishers Weekly from media conglomerate Reed Elsevier. It built and operates the website.

== Awards ==
In 1999 the DataLounge won GLAAD Media Award for Outstanding Gay Interactive Media.

== See also ==
- Tech companies in the New York metropolitan area
