= DataLounge =

Internet forum

- Website type: Internet forum
- Available in: English
- Dissolved: July 30, 2026
- Owner: Mediapolis
- Creator: Mediapolis
- Website: datalounge.com
- Commercial: Yes
- Registration: Optional
- Launched: May 1995
- Current status: defunct

DataLounge (also styled as Datalounge and The Data Lounge) was an internet forum. Its core community, predominantly composed of anonymous posters, shared news, opinions, gossip, personal stories, and political views from a gay perspective. A key focus of the forum was discussing and speculating about the sexuality of celebrities.

While the forum guidelines nominally required posters to be respectful of others, much of the site's appeal lay in its appreciation of wit, satire, and "pointless bitchery." This was complemented by a shared history spanning over 25 years, which gave rise to numerous in-jokes among its community.

According to its webmaster (as of June 2006), DataLounge received approximately 6.5 million page views each month. The site was created in May 1995 by Mediapolis, a New York City-based interactive media company.

In June 2026, the website announced it would close permanently on July 31, 2026; it closed a day earlier, July 30, 2026.

== History ==
DataLounge was launched by Mediapolis in May 1995. In its early years, the site served as a gay web portal, featuring gay-oriented news, gossip, links to other sites and services, as well as editorial content. Notable contributors included New York drag queen Trudy and journalist Chris Barillas. DataLounge also established affiliations through the DataLounge Network with other gay-and-lesbian-oriented websites, such as the dating site Edwina.com, the web guide Homorama, and Gay Health. Additionally, a weekly email subscription was offered to users.

By 2000, the site had expanded to include several discussion forums covering topics such as lesbian issues, religion, and sexuality. It also introduced a "Flames and Freaks" forum to contain threads deemed disruptive to general discussions by site administrators. Special-interest subforums were briefly created for fans of The Lord of the Rings and U.S. daytime dramas but were eventually closed. The most popular section by far was the Gossip Forum, which outpaced all other forums in both traffic and the number of discussion threads created.

A portion of DataLounge's content, as well as content from the DataLounge Network, originated from the integration of material from Out magazine's website. Out.com ceased operations in March 1997 (later reactivated) to concentrate on its print edition. Following its closure, Out.com users were redirected to DataLounge, which adopted Out.com's discussion forums, dating service, and weekly survey.

=== Site policies and technical changes ===
In 2003, DataLounge introduced a subscription service that allowed users to browse the site without advertisements for an annual fee of $12. This fee was later increased to $15 and subsequently to its current rate of $18.

In 2005, DataLounge underwent a major redesign. All forum topics were consolidated into a single general discussion forum called "The DataLounge Forum." News content, most references to other sites in the DataLounge Network, and several other features were discontinued. However, editorial commentary on current events continued to appear on the site. Users were also given the ability to customize aspects of the site's layout, including filtering out political, gossip, and/or "Flames and Freaks" (troll) threads.

The 2005 redesign also introduced a policy change that restricted access to the DataLounge Forum during high-traffic "Primetime" periods to fee-paying subscribers. This decision was met with criticism from users, as non-subscribers were completely barred from accessing the forum during these times. DataLounge administrators explained that the Primetime policy was necessary to prevent server slowdowns affecting other Mediapolis-hosted sites and to generate revenue for hosting, bandwidth, and maintenance expenses. In the summer of 2007, DataLounge further limited functionality by instituting a policy allowing only paying members to start threads.

In May 2009, DataLounge introduced a comprehensive redesign of the site, referred to as "V6". This update allowed users to embed photos and YouTube videos, as well as mark specific threads to follow. The new design also featured real-time auto-refresh as new posts were created. Another major redesign was rolled out gradually in 2014 and 2015. The updated site replaced multiple pages with a single "infinite scroll" page that hosts all non-archived threads, while individual threads were also condensed into single pages.

The most significant feature of the latest redesign is the ability to fine-tune the user experience to filter out offensive content. A "Flames and Freaks" slider allows users to adjust the level of filtering between two extremes: "Delicate Flower" (which blocks most troll posts) and "Asbestos Eyeballs" (with no filtering). Users can also choose to ignore individual posters and/or entire threads. Additionally, users can bestow "Wit and Wisdom" (WW) or "Flames and Freaks" (FF), similar to upvoting/downvoting on Reddit. Threads and posts receiving a certain number of FFs are grayed out, with the text struck through. Particularly annoying or offensive trolls are "red-tagged" by the webmaster, who labels their posts with a red tag (e.g., "Troll 5529") and sometimes includes a description or comment, such as "Stop responding to this freak".

In another effort to manage trolling, the latest iteration of DataLounge uses cookie-based tracking to assign "reputation" to site visitors. Non-paying visitors can start threads but must lurk for a minimum of a few hours to a few days, without clearing their browser cookies, to gain permission to post in threads, give WWs/FFs, and vote in polls. Posters with excessive negative reputation (such as receiving FFs or being ignored) forfeit these privileges. Visitors who clear their cookies lose their reputation and must restart the process to regain privileges, while subscribers maintain their reputation as long as they log in and adhere to DataLounge's rules.

== Members and moderation ==
DataLoungers can insert any name into the username field when creating a post. Previously, posters had the option to remain completely anonymous, post under any name of their choosing (as mentioned above), or be authenticated by registering with a unique email address. Authenticated users were distinguished by "(authenticated)" following their usernames in posts, which helped differentiate them from trolls using the same names.

Authenticated posters were common in DataLounge's early years, and some users became notable characters on the site. Over time, however, the site culture began to discourage authenticated posting, viewing it as attention-seeking. Some authenticated posters were also criticized for their comments. As a result, most comments today are made anonymously.

In May 2019, DataLounge implemented mandatory email-based registration as an additional measure to combat trolling, while still allowing users to post anonymously.

DataLounge is largely self-moderated, but from time to time, threads are closed or deleted by "Muriel," the nickname for the webmaster.

== DataLounge community ==
Community members are often labeled as "trolls" by others (or sometimes self-identify) because they are fans of a particular celebrity or enthusiastic about a specific topic. For example, the Lisa Whelchel Troll is a devoted fan of former Facts of Life actress Lisa Whelchel.

DataLounge has several shared narratives or stories that have persisted through the years, often involving collective, collaborative posts with recurring characters. For example, sarcastic and darkly comic comments about child-rearing and motherhood might be signed by "Mrs. Patsy Ramsey". A former poster, "Cheryl", eventually became a "character" featured in various threads, as did "Peg." Another DataLounge character is "Momma", who frequently reports on the latest crime sprees and the attractive imprisoned "cagemeat" she would like to date. A poster known as FCI (Former Congressional Intern) shares supposed insider information about Washington DC from time to time, and did correctly divulge the first impeachment of President Trump the night before it was announced. Aunt Liz, named after a character on the soap opera "Another World", shared "her" wealth of knowledge about daytime dramas, especially Procter & Gamble soap operas.

Several of the site's most memorable shared stories and narratives emerged in response to news events, particularly during moments of collective trauma, such as 9/11. Responses to these events varied between heartbreak and gallows humor.

== Gossip ==
Since its inception, DataLounge has been an active repository for gossip. In its early years, the site's under-the-radar status as a gay and lesbian-focused forum encouraged some entertainment industry sources to "spill the tea" and post on the site.

While the reliability of gossip items has always been questionable, DataLounge is still frequently cited as a source on stories featured on other news and gossip sites, including NewNowNext, Gawker, Queerty, The Advocate, and Dlisted.

In recent years, the site has been inundated with news items, discussions, and threads that take on an obsessive quality, often focused on narratives about celebrities and their personal relationships. This includes several threads about actors, as well as various gossip items concerning conflicts within the British royal family.

=== Marcia Cross controversy ===
DataLounge made mainstream news in February 2005 when a "friendly spy," claiming to work at ABC, posted that Desperate Housewives actress Marcia Cross was preparing to come out as a lesbian in an upcoming issue of The Advocate.

Within days, the rumor spread rapidly and garnered mentions in the media, including CNN, Entertainment Weekly, and Fox Television's Los Angeles affiliate. However, Cross denied the rumors in an interview with Barbara Walters and her co-hosts on The View. The Advocate later published an article chronicling the incident.

=== Notable DataLounge visitors ===
Rosie O'Donnell has mentioned visiting DataLounge in magazine interviews.

Author, entrepreneur, and reality TV personality Josh Kilmer-Purcell is a former DataLounge authenticated poster who used to post as "josh".

In 2017, talk show host Andy Cohen criticized DataLounge, calling the website a "vile pit of trollery".

== See also ==
- Homosocialization
