= Text-based web browser =

Web browser that only renders text

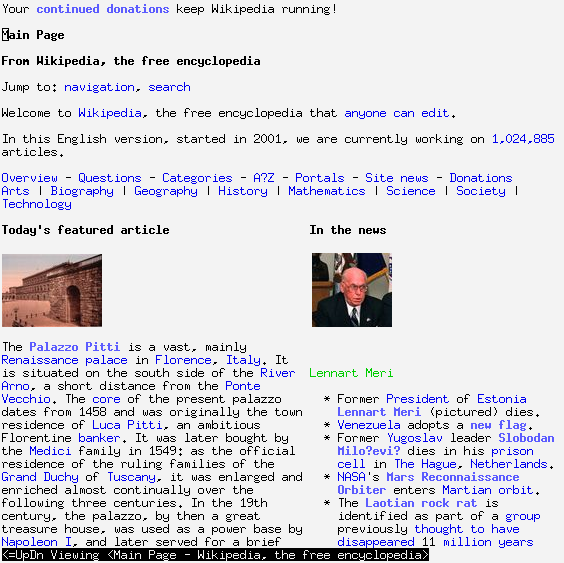
w3m displaying the Wikipedia home page with images

A text-based web browser is a web browser that renders only the text of web pages, and ignores most graphic content. Under small bandwidth connections, usually, they render pages faster than graphical web browsers due to lowered bandwidth demands. Additionally, the greater CSS, JavaScript and typography functionality of graphical browsers require more CPU resources. They also can be heavily modified to display certain content differently.

Text-based browsers are often very useful for users with visual impairment or partial blindness. They are especially useful with speech synthesis or text-to-speech software, which reads content to users.

Progressive enhancement allows a site to be compatible with text-based web browsers without compromising functionality to more sophisticated browsers, as the content is readable through pure HTML without CSS or JavaScript.

== List of notable text-based web browsers ==
- browsh
- Charlotte Web Browser (for VM/CMS)
- Emacs/W3 & EWW for GNU Emacs
- Line Mode Browser (by Tim Berners-Lee)
- Links
  - ELinks
- Lynx (and derivatives ALynx and DosLynx)
- w3m

== See also ==
- Comparison of lightweight web browsers
- Gemini (protocol)
- Gopher (protocol)
- Text-based email client
