= Fetch (FTP client) =

FTP client for Mac OS

- Developer: Fetch Softworks
- Stable release: 5.8.3 / January 16, 2023; 3 years ago
- Operating system: Classic Mac OS, macOS
- Type: FTP client
- License: Proprietary
- Website: fetchsoftworks.com

Fetch is a full-featured GUI-based FTP client for the classic Mac OS and macOS made by Fetch Softworks. In addition to basic FTP functionality, Fetch includes such features as editing files without having to download them and re-upload them. In version 5.0, support for SFTP was added, and in version 5.2, FTPS was added.

== History ==
Fetch was created in the summer of 1989 by Jim Matthews, an employee of Dartmouth College. At the time, it was intended primarily for internal college use. Fetch was maintained and updated as a Dartmouth software project and was eventually released as shareware, becoming very popular in the Macintosh community. Due to its status as an official product of an educational institution, Fetch was always free for educational users.

The first version of Fetch was a desk accessory. For most of the 1990s it competed with Anarchie as one of the two main Mac FTP clients.

After being a contestant on the game show Who Wants to Be a Millionaire in December 2000, Matthews used his winnings to purchase the Fetch source code and launch Fetch Softworks. Fetch 4.0, the first version of the application to support Mac OS X, was released in 2001.

== Essay contest ==
In September 2007, Fetch Softworks hosted a back-to-school essay contest for students, teachers, or anyone else affiliated with an educational institution. There were five winners: four second-prize winners and one grand-prize winner; the second-place contestants were awarded a third-generation iPod Nano and $100. The grand-prize winner was given a black Apple MacBook along with $750. The contest asked Fetch users how they incorporated Fetch into their lives.
