= The Hartlepool Post =

- Format: Online newspaper
- Editor: Steve Fleet
- Founded: 2002 (High Tax Hartlepool)
- Relaunched: 2012
- Political alignment: Independent
- Headquarters: Hartlepool
- Website: www.hartlepoolpost.co.uk

The Hartlepool Post was an online newspaper and forum serving Hartlepool and the surrounding area.

The paper opposed the whipped system of party politics in local Government and supported Independent Councillors. Most of its content therefore related to local politics and was often critical of the whipped parties.

== Popularity ==
Alexa Rank ▲2,937,116 (May 2013)
Alexa Rank ▼9,855,331 (Nov 2014)
