= Alan Emtage =

Barbadian-Canadian computer scientist

Alan Emtage BJH
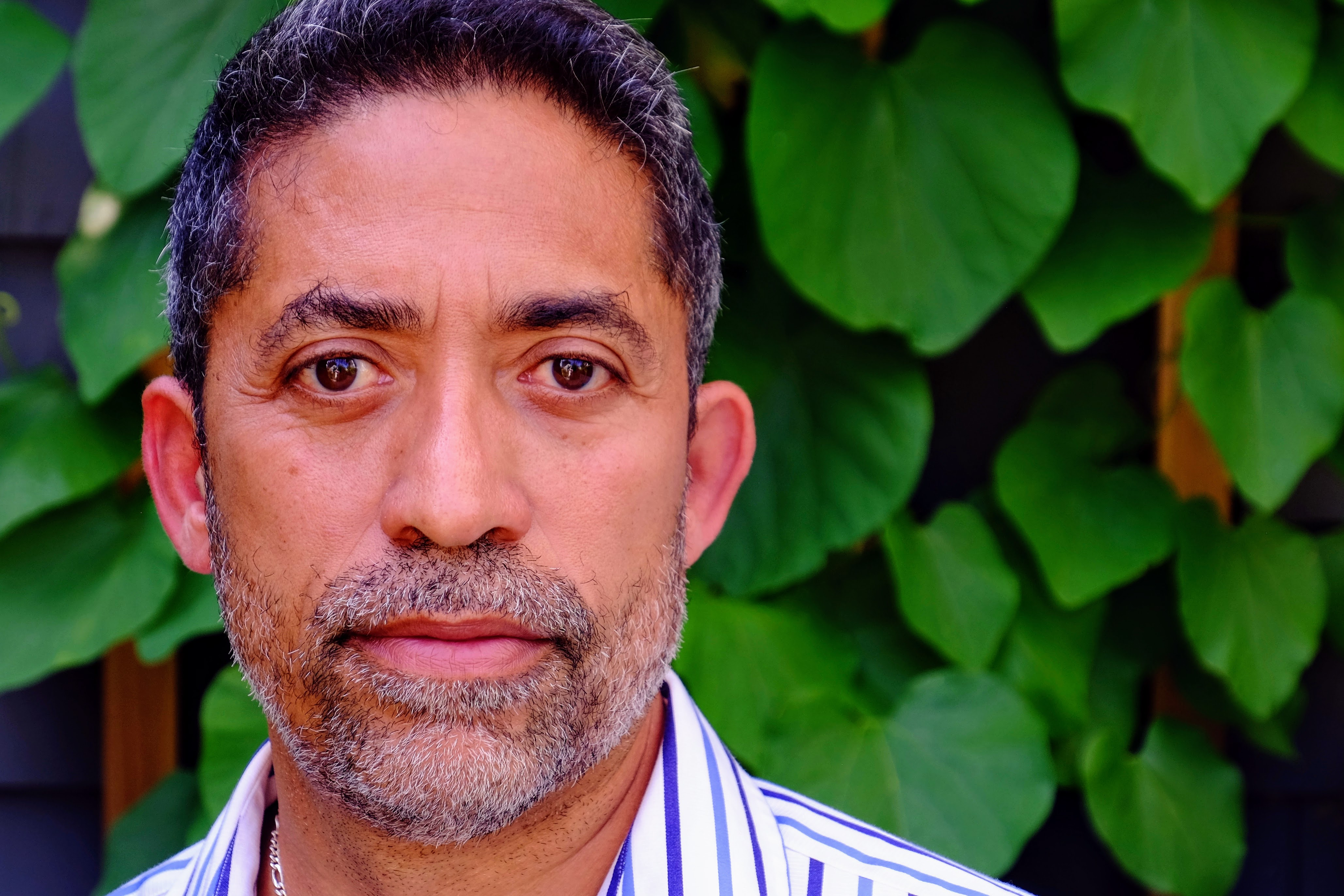
- Emtage in 2019
- Born: Stephen Alan Emtage; November 27, 1964 (age 61); Bridgetown, Barbados
- Citizenship: Barbadian; Canadian
- Education: McGill University (BSc); McGill University (MSc)
- Known for: Archie (search engine)
- Website: alanemtage.com

Alan Emtage (born November 27, 1964) is a Bajan-Canadian computer scientist who conceived and implemented the first version of Archie, a pre-Web Internet search engine for locating material in public FTP archives. It is widely considered the world's first Internet search engine.

== Life ==
Emtage was born in Barbados, the son of Sir Stephen and Margot Lady Emtage. He attended high school at Harrison College from 1975 to 1983 (and in 1981 became the owner of a Sinclair ZX81 with 1K of memory), where he graduated at the top of his class, winning the Barbados Scholarship.

In 1983 Emtage entered McGill University in Montreal, Quebec, Canada, studying for an honors Bachelor's degree in computer science which was followed by a Master's degree in 1987 from which he graduated in 1991. Emtage was part of the team that brought the first Internet link to eastern Canada (and only the second link in the country) in 1986. In 1989 while a student and working as a systems administrator for the School of Computer Science, Emtage conceived and implemented the original version of the Archie search engine, the world's first Internet search engine.

In 1992, Emtage along with J. Peter Deutsch, also a McGill graduate, formed Bunyip Information Systems in Montreal—the world's first company expressly founded for and dedicated to providing Internet information services with a licensed commercial version of the Archie search engine.

Emtage was a founding member of the Internet Society and went on to create and chair several working groups at the Internet Engineering Task Force (IETF), the standard-setting body for the Internet. Working with other pioneers such as Tim Berners-Lee, Marc Andreessen, Mark McCahill (creator of Gopher) and Jon Postel, Emtage co-chaired the Uniform Resource Identifier working group which created the standard for Uniform Resource Locators (URLs).

In 2017, Emtage was inducted as an Innovator by the Internet Society into the Internet Hall of Fame in a ceremony in Los Angeles. In 2019, Emtage was conferred the Honorary Degree of Doctor of Science from the University of the West Indies, and in 2022 received an Honorary Degree of Doctor of Science from McGill University.

Emtage has spoken and lectured on Internet Information Systems and is chief technical officer at Mediapolis, a Web engineering company in New York City.

== Works ==
- A. Emtage, P. Deutsch, archie - An Electronic Directory Service for the Internet Winter Usenix Conference Proceedings 1992. Pages 93–110.
- Michael F. Schwartz, Alan Emtage, Brewster Kahle, B. Clifford Neuman, A Comparison of Internet Resource Discovery Approaches, Computing Systems, Fall 1992, pp. 461–493, 5(4),
- P. Deutsch, A. Emtage, A. Marine, How to Use Anonymous FTP (RFC1635, May 1994)
- Alan Emtage, "Publishing in the Internet environment", Proceedings of the Sixth Joint European Networking Conference, 1995
- Alan Emtage, "Can You Imagine A World Without Search?", Medium, September 2015
