= NetPresenz =

WWW and FTP server

- Developer: Stairways Software Pty Ltd
- Stable release: 4.1 / March 7, 2000; 26 years ago
- Type: FTP, Gopher server
- License: freeware
- Website: www.stairways.com/main/netpresenz

NetPresenz, written by Peter N. Lewis for Stairways Software Pty Ltd, is a World Wide Web and File Transfer Protocol (FTP) server developed for use on the classic Mac OS. The software was initially called FTPd but was rebranded NetPresenz. In 1994 Network World stated that it was "by far the most common" FTP server application and server extension used on the Macintosh. It is considered the most significant FTP daemon available for the Macintosh platform, with added Web and Gopher functionality. The server functioned on Mac OS 7, Mac OS 8, and Mac OS 9.

Originally a shareware package, NetPresenz was rendered obsolete by increasing functionality in the Mac OS and has been made freeware.
