= ELinks =

Text-based web browser

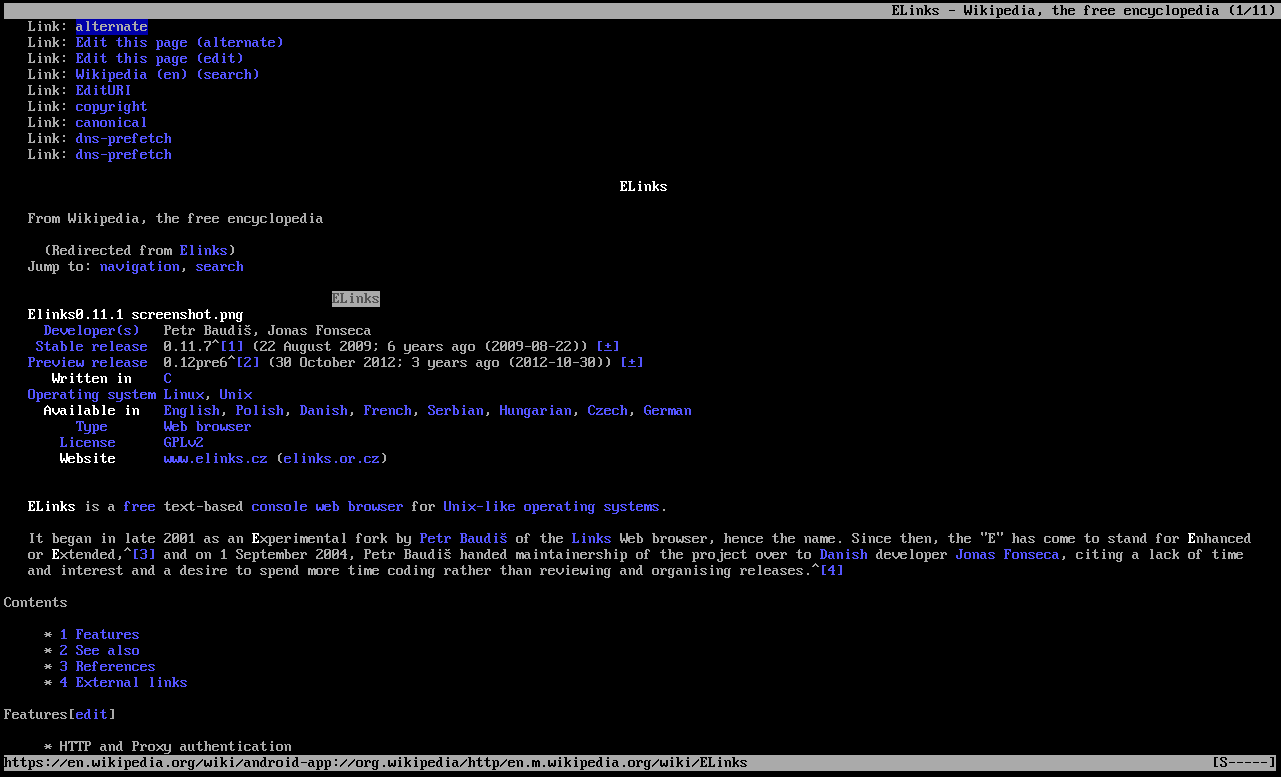
- An older version of this article rendered in ELinks
- Original authors: Petr Baudiš, Jonas Fonseca
- Developer: Witold Filipczyk
- Initial release: March 2, 2002; 23 years ago
- Stable release: 0.19.1 / 7 February 2026; 22 days ago
- Preview release: 0.19.0rc1 / December 6, 2025; 2 months ago
- Written in: C, C++
- Operating system: DOS, Linux, Windows
- Available in: English, Polish, Danish, French, Serbian, Hungarian, Czech, German,
- Type: Text-based web browser
- License: GPL 2.0 only
- Website: github.com/rkd77/elinks
- Repository: github.com/rkd77/elinks

ELinks is a text-based web browser for the operating systems DOS, Linux, and Windows. It is free and open-source software with a GNU General Public License (GPL) 2.0 only.

== History ==
It began in late 2001 as an experimental fork by Petr Baudiš of the Links Web browser, hence the E in the name. Since then, the E has come to stand for Enhanced or Extended. On 1 September 2004, Baudiš handed maintainership of the project over to Danish developer Jonas Fonseca, citing a lack of time and interest and a desire to spend more time coding rather than reviewing and organising releases.

On 17 March 2017, OpenBSD removed ELinks from its ports tree, citing concerns with security issues and lack of responsiveness from the developers.

On 17 November 2017, ELinks was forked into another program named felinks, meaning forked elinks. On 1 December 2020, the felinks repository on GitHub was renamed to elinks, with permission from Baudiš, as the old ELinks was not being actively maintained.

elinks is being actively maintained: preview version 0.18.0rc1 was released 7 December 2024, while stable version 0.18.0 was released 25 December 2024.

== Features ==
- HTTP and Proxy authentication
- Persistent HTTP cookies
- Support for browser scripting in Perl, Python, Ruby, Lua and GNU Guile
- Tabs (though still text mode)
- HTML tables and HTML frames
- Background download with queueing
- Some support for Cascading Style Sheets
- Some support for ECMAScript by using Mozilla's SpiderMonkey JavaScript engine
- Editing of text boxes in external text editor
- Mouse support, with wheel scroll
- Colour text display
- Protocols supported:
  - local files, Finger, Hypertext Transfer Protocol HTTP, Hypertext Transfer Protocol Secure (HTTPS), File Transfer Protocol (FTP), File Service Protocol (FSP), Server Message Block (SMB), Internet Protocol version 4 (IPv4), Internet Protocol version 6 (IPv6)
  - experimental: BitTorrent, gopher, gemini, nntp

== See also ==
- Text-based web browser
- List of web browsers
- Comparison of web browsers
