= Fetch Softworks =

- Industry: software
- Founded: 1989
- Founder: Jim Matthews
- Headquarters: Etna, New Hampshire

Fetch Softworks is the developer of the Mac FTP client, Fetch. The first version of Fetch was created in 1989 by Fetch Softworks founder, Jim Matthews, when he was an employee of Dartmouth College. After participating on Who Wants to be a Millionaire, Jim Matthews used his winnings to purchase Fetch’s source code and name from Dartmouth College to start Fetch Softworks. Fetch Softworks has three full-time developers and is located in Etna, New Hampshire.
