= Dlisted =

American celebrity gossip blog, 2005–2023

DListed
- Website type: Celebrity gossip
- Available in: English
- Owner: Michael Kuroiwa
- Website: dlisted.com
- Launched: 23 January 2005 – 30 June 2023
- Current status: Inactive

Dlisted was a celebrity gossip blog written by Michael Kuroiwa, known initially to readers as "Michael K." The site was launched on January 23, 2005, as the D-List, but changed its name to Dlisted because the domain name was available. The blog ended on June 30, 2023 after 18 years in existence.

== Overview ==
Dlisted focused on celebrity gossip and was known for covering the exploits of particular celebrities in detail, including Britney Spears, Madonna, Angelina Jolie, Lady Gaga, Gwyneth Paltrow, the Kardashians, Lindsay Lohan's mother Dina Lohan, UK glamour model Katie Price, media personality Phoebe Price, and former Playboy model Shauna Sand. The site bestowed nicknames on several of its subjects, including "Prince Hot Ginge" for Prince Harry, "White Oprah" for Dina Lohan, “Wonky McValtrex” for Paris Hilton, “Pimp Mama Kris” for Kris Jenner and "Rojo Caliente" for Christine Marinoni, the wife of Cynthia Nixon.

The site was originally launched in The D-List but changed its name to Dlisted because the domain name was available; he joked that it was due to a copyright conflict with Kathy Griffin: My Life on the D-List. Dlisted had regular columns and features, including "Hot Slut of the Day" (which culminates in a vote for "Hot Slut of the Year") and a "Caption This" contest. Michael K's style and humor have been described as "snarky" and "unforgiving," which fit the blog's tagline: "Be Very Afraid."

After several years of being known as Michael K, his full name, Michael Kuroiwa, was revealed. Kuroiwa was initially the only writer, and after other writers joined the Dlisted staff, still contributed at least one post a day. Initially, Kuriowa launched the blog semi-anonymously, leaving out his last name because he held a full-time job at an Internet company and performed much of his blogging from the office. Due to the success of the website, he was able to make enough money through advertising that he quit his job and began working on the site full-time. The blog had more than a million hits a day in 2007.

Dlisted: The Podcast launched in August 2018 and was co-hosted by Kuroiwa and site contributor Allison Davey.

In an October 2008 interview with SheWired.com, Kuroiwa spoke about the creation of Dlisted. "I worked at a job for M, which is like a Manhunt type thing. I wrote the letters and stuff and I kind of just started writing there on my down time. At lunch when I had nothing to do I would write about stuff. I didn't think it would become anything. It was just stupid fun and then, it was about six months to a year later when I realized there were people reading it and that's when I had to decide where I was going to go with it."

In the same interview with SheWired.com, Kuroiwa was asked to name the reason for the blog's success. He said, "I don't know. I never promoted it. I never advertised. That was never my goal. I think it was that my friends would read it and they'd send it to their friends. I used to post personal pictures and stuff because I saw it as both a personal blog and a blog about just things that I like. So that's when I decided I wasn't going to make it personal. I was just going to cover this and focus on that."

On June 23, 2023, Kuroiwa announced that the site would "close for good" on June 30, 2023. In a podcast posted a few days later, Kuroiwa said he was burned out after years of creating content; he had tried to sell Dlisted, but realized it would not be the same under new ownership.
