= Wide Area Information Server =

Internet information retrieval service

Wide Area Information Server (WAIS) is a client–server text searching system that uses the ANSI Standard Z39.50 Information Retrieval Service Definition and Protocol Specifications for Library Applications" (Z39.50:1988) to search index databases on remote computers. It was developed in 1990 as a project of Thinking Machines, Apple Computer, Dow Jones, and KPMG Peat Marwick.

WAIS did not adhere to either the Z39.50 standard nor its OSI framework, adopting instead TCP/IP. It created a unique protocol inspired by Z39.50:1988.

== History ==
The WAIS protocol and servers were promoted by Thinking Machines Corporation (TMC) of Cambridge, Massachusetts. TMC-produced WAIS servers ran on their massively parallel CM-2 (Connection Machine) and SPARC-based CM-5 MP supercomputers. WAIS clients were developed for various operating systems and windowing systems including Microsoft Windows, Macintosh, NeXT, X, GNU Emacs, and character terminals. TMC released a free open source software version of WAIS for Unix in 1991.

Inspired by the WAIS project on full-text databases and emerging SGML projects, Z39.50 version 2 (Z39.50:1992) was released. Unlike its 1988 predecessor, it was a compatible superset of the international ISO 10162/10163 standard.

With the advent of Z39.50:1992, the termination of support for free WAIS by Thinking Machines and the establishment of WAIS Inc as a commercial venture, the U.S. National Science Foundation funded the Clearinghouse for Networked Information Discovery and Retrieval (CNIDR) to promote Internet search and discovery systems, open source and standards. CNIDR created a new, free open-source WAIS. This was the first freeWAIS based on the wais-8-b5 codebase of TMC, with a wholly new software suite Isite based upon Z39.50:1992 using Isearch as its full-text search engine.

Ulrich Pfeifer and Norbert Gövert of the computer science department of the University of Dortmund extended the CNIDR freeWAIS code to become freeWAIS-sf with structured fields as its main improvement. Ulrich Pfeifer rewrote freeWAIS-sf in Perl, becoming WAIT.

Inspired by WAIS' "Directory of Servers", Eliot Christian of USGS envisioned GILS: Government Information Locator Service. GILS (based upon Z39.50:1992 with some extensions) became a U.S. Federal mandate as part of the Paperwork Reduction Act of 1995 (44 U.S.C. § 3511).

== Directory of Servers ==
Thinking Machines Corp provided a service called the Directory of Servers. It was a WAIS server like any other information source except containing information about the other WAIS servers on the Internet. A WAIS server with TMC WAIS code creates a special record containing metadata plus some common words describing its indexed content. The record is uploaded to the central server and indexed along with the records from other public servers. The directory can be searched to find servers that might have content relevant to a specific field of interest. This model of searching for (WAIS) servers to search became the model for GILS and Peter Deutsch's WHOIS++ distributed white pages directory.

== People ==
Two of the developers of WAIS, Brewster Kahle and Harry Morris, left Thinking Machines to found WAIS Inc in Menlo Park, California, with Bruce Gilliat. WAIS Inc. was originally a joint project between Apple Computer, Peat Marwick, Dow Jones, and Thinking Machines. In 1992, the presidential campaign of Ross Perot used the WAIS product as a campaign-wide information system, connecting the field offices to the national office. Later, Perot Systems adopted WAIS to better access the information in its corporate databases. Other early clients were the Environmental Protection Agency, Library of Congress, and the Department of Energy and later the Wall Street Journal and Encyclopædia Britannica.

WAIS Inc was sold to AOL in May 1995 for $15 million. Following the sale, Margaret St. Pierre left WAIS Inc to start Blue Angel Technologies. Her WAIS variant formed the basis of MetaStar. Georgios Papadopoulos left to found Atypon. François Schiettecatte left Human Genome Project at Johns Hopkins Hospital and started FS-Consult and developed his own variant of WAIS which eventually became ScienceServer, which was later sold to Elsevier Science. Kahle and Gilliat went on to found the Internet Archive and Alexa Internet.

== WAIS and Gopher ==
Public WAIS is often used as a full-text search engine for individual Internet Gopher servers, supplementing the popular Veronica system which only searches the menu titles of Gopher sites. WAIS and Gopher share the World Wide Web's client–server architecture and a certain amount of its functionality. The WAIS protocol is influenced largely by the z39.50 protocol designed for networking library catalogs. It allows a text-based search, and retrieval following a search. Gopher provides a free text search mechanism, but principally uses menus. A menu is a list of titles, from which the user may pick one. While Gopher Space is a web containing many loops, the menu system gives the user the impression of a tree.

The Web's data model is similar to the gopher model, except that menus are generalized to hypertext documents. In both cases, simple file servers generate the menus or hypertext directly from the file structure of a server. The Web's hypertext model permits the author more freedom to communicate the options available to the reader, as it can include headings and various forms of list structure.

== See also ==
- Timeline of the history of the Internet
