= Steve Dorner =

American software engineer

Steve Dorner is an American software engineer who developed the Eudora e-mail client in 1988 as a part of his work as a staff member at the University of Illinois at Urbana-Champaign. Dorner was hired by Qualcomm in July 1992 and Eudora was subsequently acquired by Qualcomm. Dorner also developed a popular online directory/phone book in the early 1990s commonly referred to as the CCSO Nameserver.

Dorner received his bachelor's degree in computer science in 1983 from the University of Illinois Urbana-Champaign.

A 1997 interview with The New York Times describes how Dorner, when he stopped working for the University and started working for Qualcomm, chose not to move to California. Instead, he was a remote worker from an office in a 1950s bomb shelter under his home in Urbana, Illinois. Later, he moved his office to his woodworking shop, which is heated.

As of 2006, Dorner was one of Qualcomm engineers tasked with shifting Eudora to a Mozilla Thunderbird base.

== Cancer diagnosis ==
In November 2010, Dorner was diagnosed with cancer, which manifested itself first as testicular cancer. As of January 2011, his personal blog reported that treatment was continuing. In July 2011, Dorner reported that his cancer might have been eradicated.
