= Nassib Nassar =

American computer scientist and classical pianist

Nassib Nassar is an American computer scientist and classical pianist.

== Career ==
As a computer scientist, Nassar was among the architects of information retrieval software for the World Wide Web and was the creator of Isearch, one of the earliest open source search engines, in 1994. He was president of Etymon Systems, an open source software company founded in 1998 and best known for producing Etymon PJ, which became the standard library for generating Portable Document Format (PDF) documents in Java, and Amberfish, a large scale information retrieval system for semi-structured text and XML.

As a pianist Nassar was the winner of The American Prize in 2014 for his performance of the Brahms F minor piano sonata. Other performances have included the 32 piano sonatas of Beethoven, played in a series of seven recitals.
