= Phlog =

Blog hosted using the Gopher protocol

A phlog, also called an rlog, is a type of daybook, similar to a blog, that runs off a Gopher protocol server. These phlogs are typically hosted from home servers running some sort of UNIX operating system, because a user account on the server is usually required to update the content. There are quite a few phlogs floating around gopherspace but the vast majority are not updated regularly.

Phlogs usually arranged as a directory structure with the title or date of each entry, has a separate folder for archives. It is possible to have a few sentences under each link to a blog entry as a summary, or to host the phlog as one single text or HTML file; however, HTML files cannot be read by some pure gopher clients.

Most phlogs are maintained by hand as a series of text files. Open source software exists to convert posts from a WordPress blog into plain text files that can be accessed using the gopher protocol.

The word "phlog" is derived from "blog" but with the "ph" from "gopher" instead of the "b" from "web" and appears to have been coined by Jeff Woodall on April 22, 2003.

== Gopherlog ==
A phlog can also be known as a gopherlog. The first known usage of the term "gopherlog" was by George Hotelling as an April Fool's Day joke on April 1, 2005.
