= Clearinghouse for Networked Information Discovery and Retrieval =

The Clearinghouse for Networked Information Discovery and Retrieval or CNIDR was an organization funded by the U.S. National Science Foundation from 1993 to 1997 and based at the Microelectronics Center of North Carolina (MCNC) in Research Triangle Park. CNIDR was active in the research and development of open source software and open standards, centered on information discovery and retrieval, in the emerging Internet.

Among the software developed at CNIDR were Isite, an open source Z39.50 implementation and successor to the free version of WAIS, and Isearch, an open source text retrieval system. CNIDR staff were involved in the development of open standards in the Internet Engineering Task Force, the Z39.50 Implementors Group and Dublin Core.

CNIDR collaborated with the U.S. Patent and Trademark Office (USPTO) to develop the USPTO's first Internet-based patent search systems. One of these provided full text searching and images of medical patents related to the research and treatment of HIV/AIDS and issued by the US, Japanese and European patent offices. Another system, known as the US Patent Bibliographic Database, provided searching of "front page" bibliographic information for all US patents since 1976.
