= Interpedia =

First proposed online encyclopedia (1993)

- Website type: Online encyclopedia
- Creator: Rick Gates

Interpedia was one of the first proposed online encyclopedias which would allow anyone to contribute by writing articles and submitting them to the central catalogue of all Interpedia pages.

== History ==
Interpedia was initiated by Rick Gates (born October 18, 1956), an Internet pioneer who studied at the Graduate Library School at the University of Arizona and who had previously created The Internet Hunt. Gates posted a message titled "The Internet Encyclopedia" on October 25, 1993, to the PACS-L (Public-Access Computer Systems Forum) Listserv. That message included the following musings:

The more I thought about this, the more I realized that such a resource, containing general, encyclopedic knowledge for the layman, would be an important tool for some types of research, and for the Net.Citizenry in general.

Ahh.. but what about contributors... where will you find authors to write the short articles you need? Well, I'd first have to start out by finding some way of communicating with an extremely diverse set of people... everyone from linguists, to molecular biologists, from animal rights activists to zymurgists, and from geographers to gas chromotographers. Guess what? :-) The Net provides just such an arena! So I thought about it some more...and came to the conclusion that this is a good idea!

In November 1993, discussions moved to a dedicated mailing list, supplemented later by Usenet newsgroup comp.infosystems.interpedia.

Several independent "Seal-of-approval" (SOAP) agencies were envisioned which would rate Interpedia articles based on criteria of their own choosing; users could then decide which agencies' recommendations to follow.

The project was actively discussed for around half a year, but never left the planning stages, perhaps partly due to the unprecedented growth of the World Wide Web.

In 1995, Gates moved to Oregon, where he founded Net Assets, a Web-based software and Internet training company, and taught as an adjunct professor at a distance for the University of Arizona School of Information Resources & Library Science and the Rochester Institute of Technology through the late 1990s. He retired from Net Assets in 2005.

== See also ==
- Online encyclopedia
- List of online encyclopedias
