= Browsh =

Text-based web browser

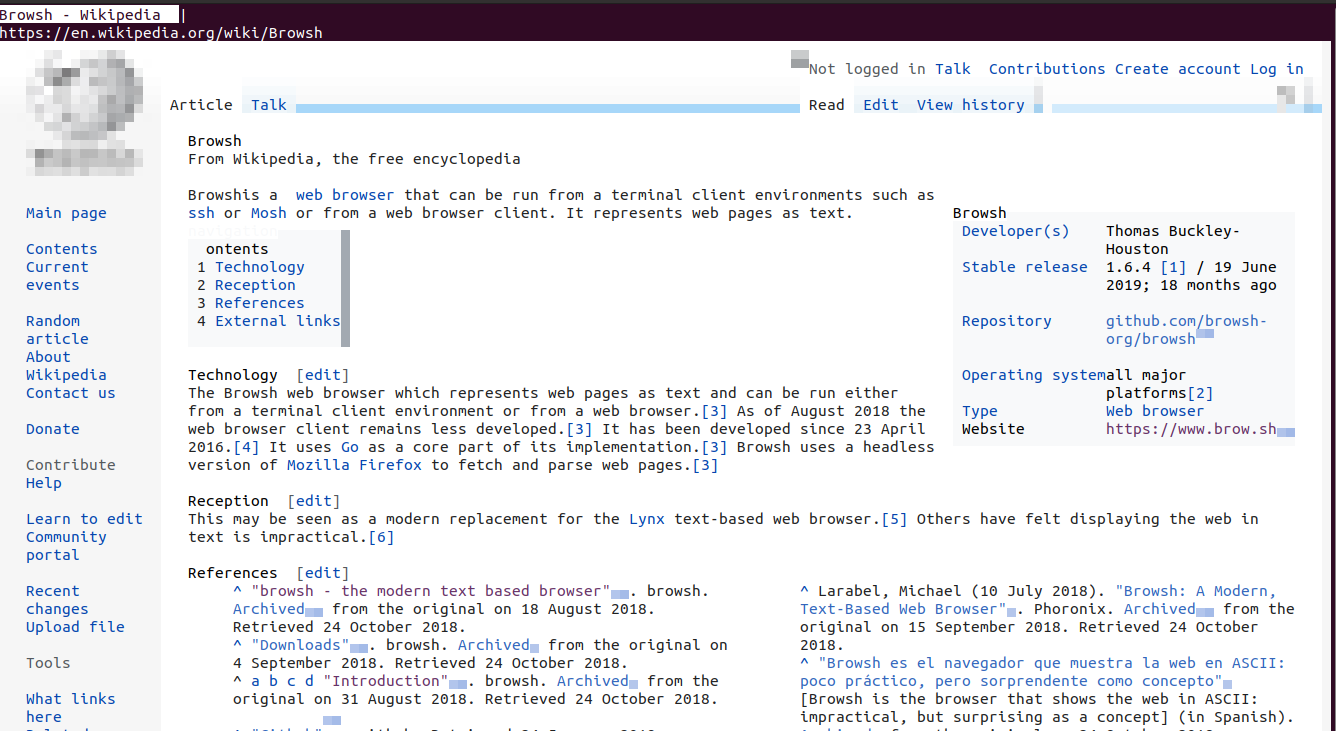
- Developer: Thomas Buckley-Houston
- Stable release: 1.8.3 / 29 January 2024; 2 years ago
- Written in: JavaScript and Go
- Operating system: all major platforms
- Type: Web browser
- License: GNU Lesser General Public License, version 2.1
- Website: www.brow.sh
- Repository: github.com/browsh-org/browsh

Browsh is a web browser that can be run from terminal client environments such as ssh and Mosh or from a web browser client. It represents web pages as text.

== Technology ==
The Browsh web browser represents web pages as text and can be run either from a terminal client environment or from a web browser. As of August 2018 the web browser client remains less developed. It has been developed since 23 April 2016. It uses Go as a core part of its implementation. Browsh uses a headless version of Mozilla Firefox to fetch and parse web pages.

== Reception ==
This may be seen as a modern replacement for the Lynx text-based web browser. Others have felt displaying the web in text is impractical.
