= Brewster Kahle =

American computer engineer and founder of the Internet Archive

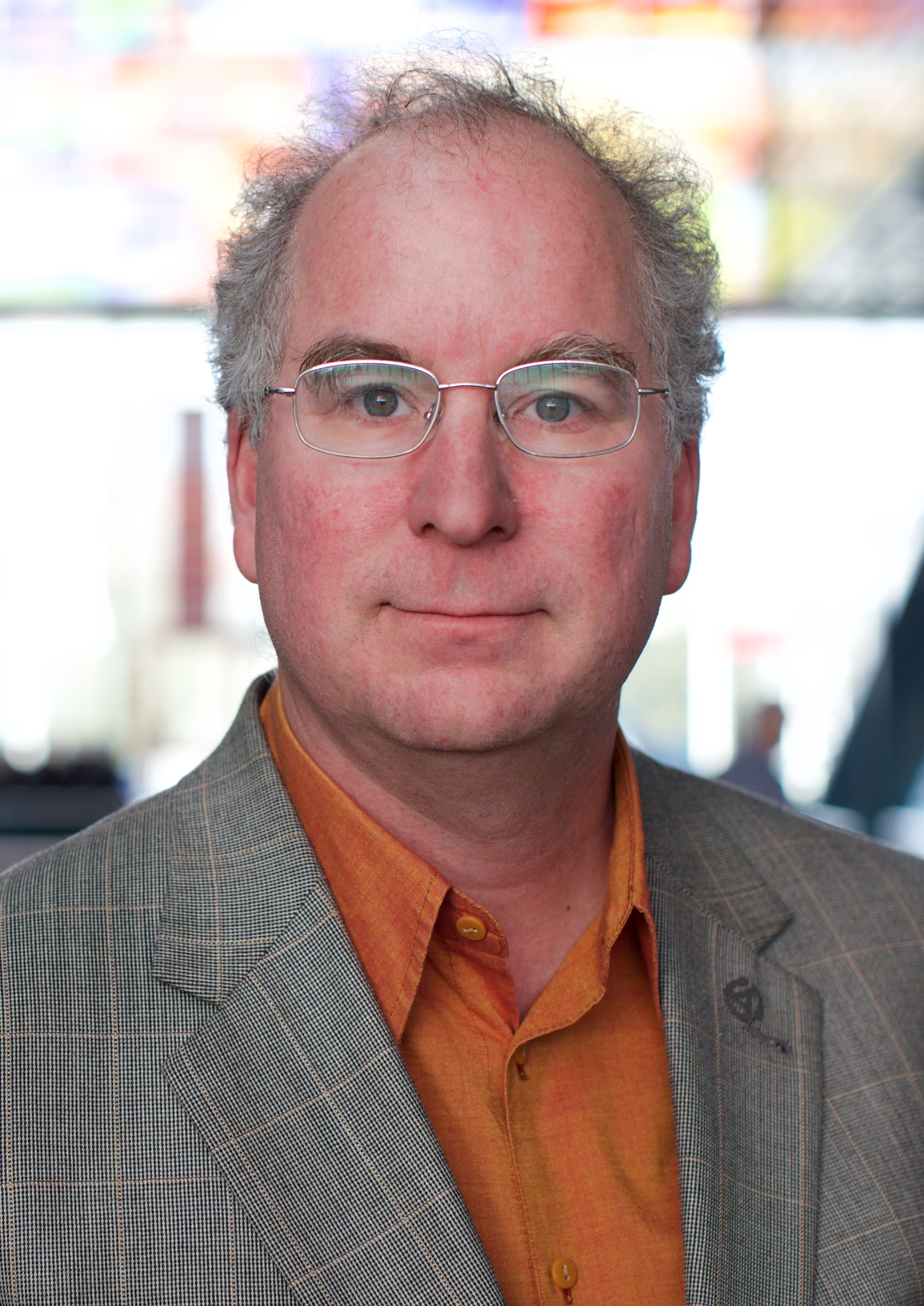
- Kahle in 2015
- Born: Brewster Lurton Kahle; October 22, 1960 (age 65); New York City, New York, U.S.
- Education: Massachusetts Institute of Technology (BS)
- Occupations: Digital librarian Computer engineer Internet entrepreneur
- Employer(s): Internet Archive, Electronic Frontier Foundation
- Known for: Development of WAIS; Co-founder of Alexa Internet; Founder of Internet Archive
- Spouse: Mary Austin
- Children: 2
- Brewster Kahle introducing himself recorded April 2015
- Website: brewster.kahle.org

Brewster Lurton Kahle (/ˈbruːstər keɪl/ BROO-stər KAYL; born October 22, 1960) is an American digital librarian, computer engineer, and internet entrepreneur. He graduated from the Massachusetts Institute of Technology in 1982 with a Bachelor of Science degree in computer science and engineering. Kahle founded the Internet Archive (including Wayback Machine) and co-founded Alexa Internet in 1996. He was inducted into the Internet Hall of Fame in 2012.

== Biography ==
=== Early life and education ===
Kahle was born in New York City and raised in Scarsdale, New York, the son of Margaret Mary (Lurton) and Robert Vinton Kahle, a mechanical engineer. He went to Scarsdale High School. He graduated from the Massachusetts Institute of Technology in 1982, receiving a Bachelor of Science degree with a major in computer science and engineering, where he was a member of Chi Phi fraternity. The emphasis of his studies was artificial intelligence; he studied under Marvin Minsky and W. Daniel Hillis.

=== Career ===
After graduation, Kahle joined the Thinking Machines team, where he was the lead engineer on the company's main product, the Connection Machine, for six years (1983–1989). There, he and others developed the WAIS system, the first Internet distributed search and document retrieval system, a precursor to the World Wide Web. In 1992, he co-founded, with Bruce Gilliat, WAIS, Inc. (sold to AOL in 1995 for $15 million), and, in 1996, Alexa Internet (sold to Amazon.com in 1999 for $250 million in stock). At the same time as he started Alexa, he founded the Internet Archive, which he continues to direct.

In 2001, he implemented the Wayback Machine, which allows public access to the World Wide Web archive that the Internet Archive has been gathering since 1996. Kahle was inspired to create the Wayback Machine after visiting the offices of Alta Vista, where he was struck by the immensity of the task being undertaken and achieved: to store and index everything that was on the Web. Kahle states: "I was standing there, looking at this machine that was the size of five or six Coke machines, and there was an 'aha moment' that said, 'You can do everything.'"

Kahle and his wife, Mary Austin, run the Kahle/Austin Foundation. The Foundation supports the Free Software Foundation for its GNU Project, among other projects, with a total giving of about $4.5 million in 2011. In 2012, Kahle and banking veteran Jordan Modell established Internet Archive Federal Credit Union to serve people in New Brunswick, New Jersey and Highland Park, New Jersey, as well as participants in programs that alleviate poverty in those areas. Following legal violations and a cease-and-desist from the National Credit Union Administration, the credit union was liquidated in December 2015.

=== Memberships ===
Kahle was elected a member of the National Academy of Engineering (2010) for archiving, and making available, all forms of digital information. He is also a member of the Internet Hall of Fame, a Fellow of the American Academy of Arts and Sciences. Kahle serves on the boards of the Electronic Frontier Foundation, Public Knowledge, the European Archive (now Internet memory) and the Television Archive. He is a member of the advisory board of the National Digital Information Infrastructure and Preservation Program of the Library of Congress, and is a member of the National Science Foundation Advisory Committee for Cyberinfrastructure. In 2010, Kahle received an honorary doctorate from Simmons University.

== Career emphasis ==
=== Advocacy for digital preservation accessibility and digitization ===
Kahle of the Internet Archive talking about archiving operations in 2013

In 1997, Kahle explained that apart from the value for historians' use of these digital archives, they might also help resolve some common infrastructure complaints about the Internet, such as adding reliability to "404 Document not found" errors, contextualizing information to make it more trustworthy, and maintaining navigation to aid in finding related content. Kahle also explained the importance of packaging enough meta-data (information about the information) into the archive, since it is unknown what future researchers will be interested in, and that it might be more problematic to find data than to preserve it.

Kahle has been critical of Google's book digitization, especially of Google's exclusivity in restricting other search engines' digital access to the books they archive. In a 2011 talk, Kahle described Google's "snippet" feature as a means of tiptoeing around copyright issues, and expressed his frustration with the lack of a decent lending system for digital materials. He said the digital transition has moved from local control to central control, non-profit to for-profit, diverse to homogeneous, and from "ruled by law" to "ruled by contract". Kahle stated that even public-domain material published before 1923, and not bound by copyright law, is still bound by Google's contracts and requires permission to be distributed or copied. Kahle reasoned that this trend has emerged for a number of reasons: distribution of information favoring centralization, the economic cost of digitizing books, the issue of library staff without the technical knowledge to build these services, and the decision of administrators to outsource information services.

Kahle advocated in 2009:

It's not that expensive. For the cost of 60 miles of highway, we can have a 10 million-book digital library available to a generation that is growing up reading on-screen. Our job is to put the best works of humankind within reach of that generation. Through a simple Web search, a student researching the life of John F. Kennedy should be able to find books from many libraries, and many booksellers—and not be limited to one private library whose titles are available for a fee, controlled by a corporation that can dictate what we are allowed to read.

=== Physical media ===
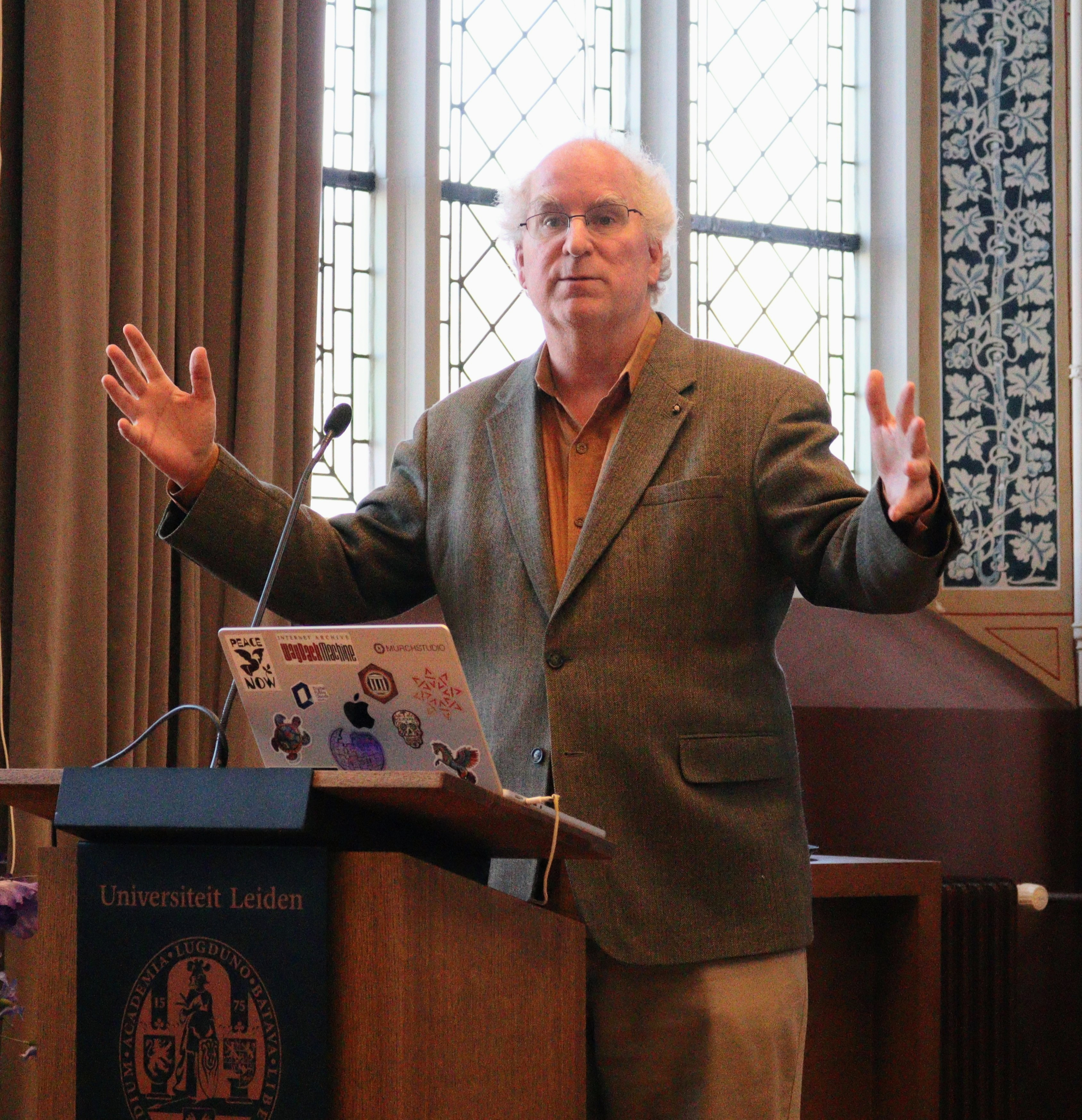
Kahle at Leiden University (2025)

"Knowledge lives in lots of different forms over time," Kahle said in 2011. "First it was in people's memories, then it was in manuscripts, then printed books, then microfilm, CD-ROMs, now on the digital internet. Each one of these generations is very important." Voicing a strong reaction to the idea of books simply being thrown away, and inspired by the Svalbard Global Seed Vault, Kahle envisioned collecting one physical copy of every book ever published. "We're not going to get there, but that's our goal," he said. "We want to see books live forever." Pointing out that even digital books have a physical home on a hard drive somewhere, he sees saving the physical artifacts of information storage as a way to hedge against the uncertainty of the future. Alongside the books, Kahle plans to store the Internet Archive's old servers, which were replaced in 2010.

Kahle began by having conventional shipping containers modified as climate-controlled storage units. Each container can hold about 40,000 volumes, the size of a branch library. As of 2011, Kahle had gathered about 500,000 books. He thinks the warehouse is large enough to hold about a million titles, with each one given a barcode that identifies the cardboard box, pallet and shipping container in which it resides. A given book may be retrieved in about an hour, not to be loaned out but to be used to verify contents recorded in another medium. Book preservation experts commented he will have to contend with vermin and about a century's worth of books printed on wood pulp paper that disintegrates over time because of its own acidity. Peter Hanff, deputy director of UC Berkeley's Bancroft Library, said that just keeping the books on the west coast of the US will save them from the climate fluctuations that are the norm in other parts of the country.

In 2024, Kahle shipped 350,000 (mainly European) dissertations from the stacks of Leiden University Library to storage of the Internet Archive in Pennsylvania. These dissertations, from the period 1850-1990, were deselected by the Leiden Library.

=== Blogging on current affairs ===
Kahle maintains a blog, described as "Thoughts about Housing, Education, Food and Health in the United States".

== Awards and appointments ==
- 2004: Paul Evan Peters Award from the Coalition of Networked Information (CNI)
- 2005: American Academy of Arts and Sciences
- Library of Congress NDIIP advisory board
- NSF Cyber Infrastructure advisory board
- 2007: Knowledge Trust Honors award recipient
- 2008: Robert B. Downs Intellectual Freedom Award from the University of Illinois
- Public Knowledge, IP3 award recipient
- 2009: "50 Visionaries Changing Your World", Utne Reader
- 2010: National Academy of Engineering
- 2010: Honorary Doctor of Laws, University of Alberta
- 2010: Zoia Horn Intellectual Freedom Award
- 2012: Software and Information Industry of America Peter Jackson Award SIIA Peter Jackson Award
- 2012: Inducted into the Internet Hall of Fame
- 2013: LITA/Library Hi Tech Award for Outstanding Communication in Library and Information Technology
- 2016: Fellowship of the Digital Preservation Coalition
- 2024: Kahle received the Lifetime Achievement in Building Internet Infrastructure Award from the Internet Infrastructure Coalition.
- 2026: Honored with the Fellow Award from the Computer History Museum.

== See also ==
- List of archivists
