= Interarchy =

Internet client

- Other names: Anarchie
- Developer: Nolobe
- Stable release: 10.0.7 / September 20, 2017; 8 years ago
- Operating system: macOS
- Type: FTP client
- License: Proprietary
- Website: nolobe.com/interarchy

Interarchy was an FTP client for macOS supporting FTP, SFTP, SCP, WebDAV and Amazon S3. It was made by Nolobe and supported many advanced features for transferring, syncing and managing files over the Internet.

Interarchy was created by Mac programmer Peter N Lewis in 1993 for Macintosh System 7. Lewis went on to form Stairways Software in 1995 to continue development of Interarchy. In 2007, Lewis sold Interarchy to Matthew Drayton of Nolobe. Drayton was an employee of Stairways Software having worked as a developer of Interarchy alongside Lewis since 2001. Interarchy was discontinued after 2017 and its website is no longer available.

Interarchy was originally called Anarchie because it was "an Archie" client. The name was changed to Interarchy in 2000 due to a conflict with a cybersquatter.
