= CCSO Nameserver =

Computer network protocol

A CCSO name-server or Ph protocol was an early form of database search on the Internet. In its most common form, it was used to look up information such as telephone numbers and email addresses. Today, this service has been largely replaced by LDAP. It was used mainly in the early-to-middle 1990s. The name-server was developed by Steve Dorner at the University of Illinois at Urbana–Champaign, at the university's Computing and Communications Services Office (CCSO).

There also exists an Outlook plugin and standalone application known as OutlookPH.

== Overview ==
The name-server directories were frequently organized in Gopher hierarchies. The tools "Ph" and "Qi" were the two components of the system: Ph was a client that queried the Qi server.

The Ph protocol was formally defined by RFC 2378 in September 1998. However, the memo issued at this time references its prior use for an unspecified period of time before this date (work on the protocol started around 1988, and it was in use from around 1991). It defines sixteen keywords that can be used on the server side to define record properties. It also defines how clients should access records on the server and what responses the server should give. Ph server communication takes place on TCP port 105.

== Command structure ==
All commands and response are initially assumed to be in US-ASCII encoding for historical reasons, unless the client explicitly asks for 8-bit (ISO-8859-1) encoding. As a result, only characters between 0x20 and 0x7E are initially sent by the server in raw form. Other characters, if present in entries, will be escaped using the RFC 2045 defined "Quoted-Printable" encoding. The initial request from the client is a text base keyword optionally followed by one or more parameters as defined in the RFC 2378. The server then responds to the request. The following example response to a status request is provided by the RFC memo.

C: status
S: 100:Qi server $Revision: 1.6 $
S: 100:Ph passwords may be obtained at CCSO Accounting,
S: 100:1420 Digital Computer Lab, between 8:30 and 5 Monday-Friday.
S: 100:Be sure to bring your U of I ID card.
S: 200:Database ready

Each command defined by the RFC 2378 memo consists of a keyword followed as needed by one or more parameters or key words. They can be separated by spaces tabs or the end of the line. Each line must be terminated in CR+LF style.

The following are a few of the commands:

 status

This command takes no parameters and simply asks the server to report its status as above.

siteinfo

Returns information such as server version mail domain and whom to contact about password issues and authentication methods.

fields [field ...]

List all available entry fields on the server or only those of the specified name or names.

 id information

Causes the server to log the specified information as the current user id without login.

set [option[=value] ...]

Sets the specified option on the server to value. If used without parameters it lists the current server settings.

login [alias]
logout

This is the actual login/logout commands for the server here the alias must be the users Ph alias. Logging in allows a user to change their own entry and view certain fields in it flag for restricted access.

answer encrypted-response
clear cleartext-password

The client normally uses one of these to send the password information after the login command is sent.

quit
exit
stop

One or more of these will be recognized by the server as an end of session command closing the connection.

== Database ==
As distributed, the nameserver was backed by a flat file database. In the early 1990s, Indiana University software developer Larry Hughes implemented a version of Qi (called "Phd") that was written in Perl and backed by a relational database. That code was distributed under an open-source license for several years prior to the university's transition to LDAP.
