= ANGIS =

The Australian National Genomic Information Service (ANGIS) provided access for biologists to a comprehensive system of bioinformatics software, databases, documentation, training and support, on a subscription basis. While clearly targeted at Australian researchers, the tools ANGIS provided were available online to investigators worldwide. ANGIS was closed at the end of 2009.

== Tools ==
BioManager was the main resource ANGIS provided. Although ANGIS/Biomanager was closed 30 November 2009, Prof Peter Reeves of the University of Sydney continues to host an implementation of BioManager on a voluntary basis. BioManager was developed from the earlier tool BioNavigator which was originally developed by a now defunct Australian bioinformatics company, Entigen(1). BioManager is a bioinformatics workflow management system that allows integration and use of multiple bioinformatic computer packages through a single web user interface. Data from analyses is stored on the system or used as inputs to other packages in BioManager. As provided by ANGIS, BioManager was a subscription-based service, with access made available to the Australian and New Zealand academic communities. Access from outside Australia and NZ was by enquiry. ANGIS also provided a variety of training resources and courses to help make these tools readily usable by the scientific community.

== History ==
ANGIS began as a project at the University of Sydney in 1990, originally the Sydney University Sequence Analysis Interface (SUSAI) as a multi-disciplinary effort spearheaded by Trevor Cole, Alex Reisner and Peter Reeves. One year later in 1991, SUSAI became ANGIS through the formation of the Australian Genomic Information Center (AGIC), a government sanctioned research center. In March 2007, oversight for ANGIS was passed to the University of Sydney in New South Wales, Australia within the newly formed Sydney Bioinformatics. ANGIS appears to have ended as an entity with the closing of Sydney Bioinformatics on 31 December 2010.

== Teaching ==
ANGIS was deeply involved in post-graduate training courses and workshops. General Bioinformatic application workshops, along with specialist workshops in proteomics, microarray, database searching and phylogenetics were held in Sydney and elsewhere in the country. In-house training courses in these areas ranged in length from 1–4 days.

BioManager has been used as the main Bioinformatics training tools for Australian and other international universities and academic subscriptions to ANGIS/BioManager included teaching logins for student use.
