= Veronica (search engine) =

Search engine

Veronica was a search engine system for the Gopher protocol, released in November 1992 by Steven Foster and Fred Barrie at the University of Nevada, Reno.

During its existence, Veronica was a constantly updated database of the names of almost every menu item on thousands of Gopher servers. The Veronica database could be searched from most major Gopher menus. Although by 1999 the original Veronica database was no longer accessible, various local Veronica installations and at least one complete rewrite ("Veronica-2") still exist.

The existence of Veronica induced another Gopher search tool from the University of Utah originally called Jughead. While the two were separate search tools, a Jughead instance could be configured with a veronica control file in order to let the Veronica harvester know how to obtain the data file from Jughead.

== Naming ==
The search engine was named after the character Veronica Lodge from Archie Comics, an intentional analogy with the naming of the Archie search engine, a search engine for FTP servers. A backronym for Veronica is "Very Easy Rodent-Oriented Net-wide Index to Computer Archives".

== See also ==
- Archie – a search engine for finding FTP files.
- Jughead – an alternative search engine system for the Gopher protocol.
- WAIS – another client-server text searching system of the same era.
