= SheWired =

American online magazine and special interest website

- SheWired front page; February 7, 2015
- Website type: Lesbian culture
- Available in: English
- Owner: Here Media
- Website: www.shewired.com
- Registration: None
- Launched: October 15, 2008
- Current status: Active

SheWired (Note: The official name of the website is listed in several places as SheWired (rather than SheWired.com).) was an online magazine and special interest website based in Los Angeles, California. Launched by LGBT media company Here Media in 2008, the magazine primarily focused on lesbian culture.
