= Bruce Gilliat =

American businessman

- Born: May 5, 1959 (age 67)
- Education: University of California, Berkeley; Massachusetts Institute of Technology; Golden Gate University
- Occupation: Internet entrepreneur
- Known for: Co-founder of Alexa Internet
- Spouse: Leise Davis (m. 2006)

Bruce Gilliat (born May 5, 1959) is the co-founder and former chief executive officer of Alexa Internet. Together with Brewster Kahle, he co-founded the Internet Archive in 1996.

On April 1, 1996, Brewster Kahle and Bruce Gilliat founded a company called Alexa Internet. The company’s original vision was to develop advanced web navigation that would continually improve itself on the basis of user-generated data.
