= Gemini (protocol) =

TCP/IP application layer protocol

- Developed by: Solderpunk et al.
- Introduced: June 2019
- Website: geminiprotocol.net

Gemtext
- Filename extension: .gmi, .gmni, .gemini
- Internet media type: text/gemini (unofficial)
- Type code: TEXT
- Developed by: Solderpunk et al.
- Latest release: 0.24.1; 28 August 2024; 2 years ago
- Type of format: Markup language
- Open format?: Yes
- Website: geminiprotocol.net/docs/gemtext-specification.gmi

Gemini, or Project Gemini, is an application-layer Internet communication protocol for accessing remote documents, similar to HTTP and Gopher. It comes with a special document format, commonly referred to as "gemtext", which allows linking to other documents. Started by a pseudonymous person known as Solderpunk, the protocol is being finalized collaboratively. As of June 2026, it has not yet been submitted to the IETF organization for standardization.

== History ==
The Gemini project was started in June 2019 by Solderpunk. Additional work has been done by an informal community of users. According to Solderpunk's FAQ, Gemini is not intended to replace Gopher or HTTP, but to co-exist with them. Much of the development happened on the Gemini mailing list until the list disappeared at the end of 2021 due to a hardware issue. The creation of the Usenet newsgroup comp.infosystems.gemini in October 2021 was the first new newsgroup in the Big Eight hierarchy in eight years.

== Design ==
The Gemini specification defines both the Gemini protocol and a native file format for that protocol, analogous to HTML for HTTP, known as "gemtext". The design is inspired by Gopher, but with modernisation such as mandatory use of Transport Layer Security (TLS) for connections and a hypertext format as native content type.

The design is deliberately not easily extensible, in order to meet a project goal of simplicity.

=== Protocol ===
Gemini is designed within the framework of the Internet protocol suite. Like HTTP/S, Gemini functions as a request–response protocol in the client–server computing model. A Gemini server should listen on TCP port 1965. A Gemini browser, for example, may be the client and an application running on a computer hosting a Gemini site may be the server. The client sends a Gemini request message to the server, and the server sends back a response message. Gemini uses a separate connection to the same server for every resource request.

Gemini mandates the use of TLS with privacy-related features and trust on first use (TOFU) verification being strongly suggested.

Browsing Gemini through Amfora - TUI client

Gemini resources are identified and located on the network by Uniform Resource Locators (URLs), using the URI scheme gemini://. A Gemini request consists only of such a URL, terminated by CRLF; the header of a Gemini response consists of a two-digit status code, a space, and a "meta" field, also terminated by CRLF. If the server is successful in finding the requested file, the "meta" field is the MIME type of the returned file and after the header follows the file data.

Example session
Client
Server

gemini://example.com/

20 text/gemini
# Example Title
Welcome to my Gemini capsule.
* Example list item
=> gemini://link.to/another/resource Link text

=== Gemtext format ===
Gemtext format is line-oriented and the first three characters of a line determine its type. The syntax includes markup for headlines, flat list items, pre-formatted text, quotes and link lines. As with HTTP hypertext, URIs are encoded as hyperlinks to form interlinked hypertext documents in the Gemini "web", which users refer to as Geminispace.

== Geminispace ==
"Geminispace" denotes the whole of the public resources that are published on the Internet by the Gemini community via the Gemini protocol. Thus, Gemini spans an alternative communication web, with hypertext documents, including hyperlinks to other resources easily accessible to the user.

As of July 2024, Geminispace consists of around 3900 online known Gemini appearances ("capsules") identified by crawling over 600,000 URIs.

== Software ==
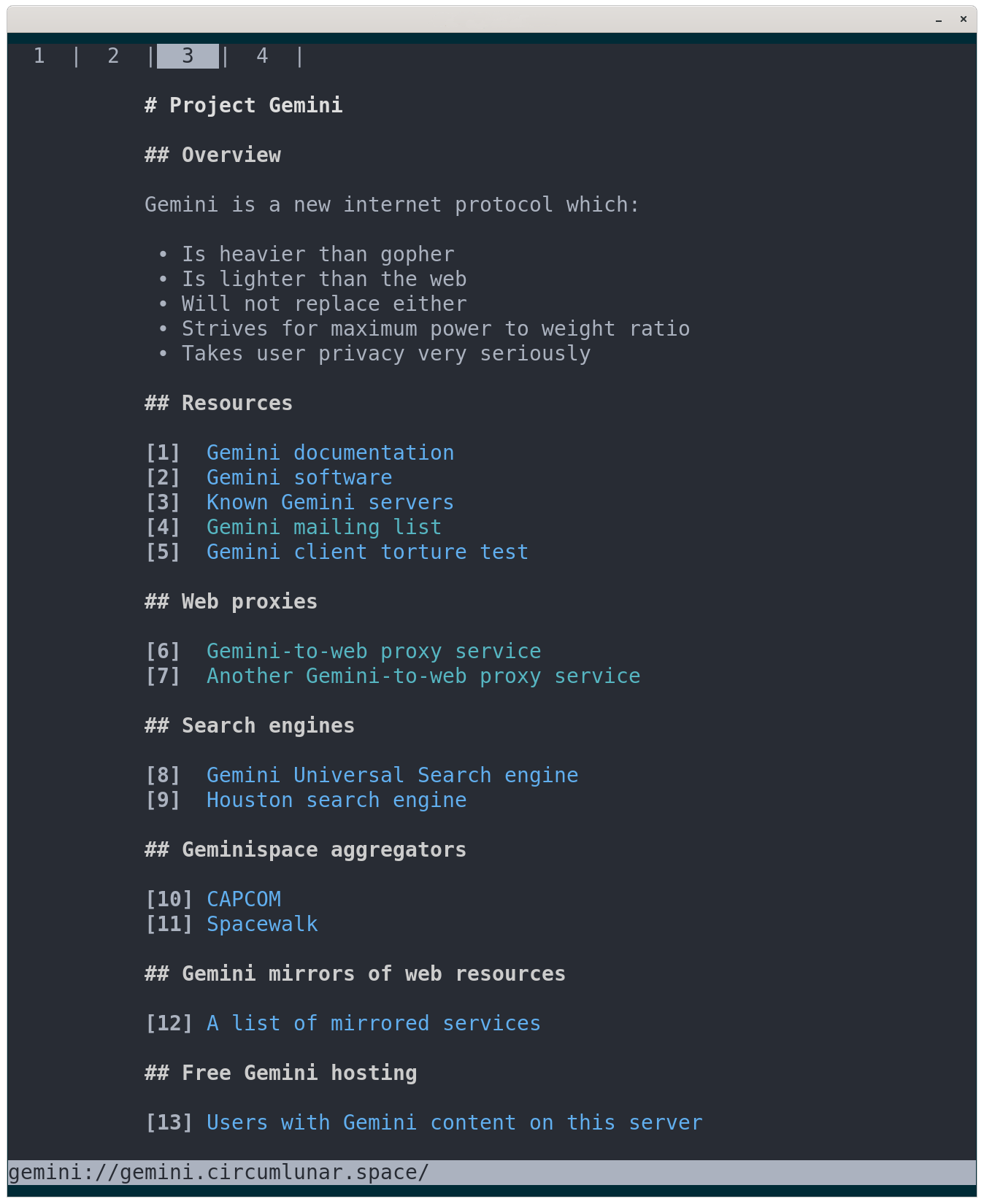
Amfora - Gemini client

AmiGemini - Gemini client

Gemini clients
Name	Platform	Client Type	License	Written in
Alhena	Linux, macOS, Windows, BSD	GUI	GPL 3.0	Java
Amfora	BSD, Linux, macOS, Windows	Terminal (TUI)	GPL 3.0	Go
AmiGemini	AmigaOS	GUI (Intuition)	MIT	C, Intuition
ereandel		Terminal (TUI)	MIT	Shell script
asuka		Terminal (TUI)	MIT	Rust, ncurses
AV-98		Terminal (CLI)	2 Clause BSD	Python
Bollux		Terminal	MIT	Bash
Bombadillo	BSD, Linux, macOS	Terminal (TUI)	GPL 3.0	Go
Buran	Android	Mobile App	GPL 3.0	Kotlin
Castor		GUI (GTK)	MIT	Rust, GTK
Castor9	Plan 9	GUI		C
Deedum	Android and iOS	Mobile App	GPL 3.0	Flutter, Dart
Diohsc		Terminal (CLI)	GPL 3.0	Haskell
dillo-gemini	BSD, Linux, macOS	Plugin (Dillo)	FSFAP	Shell
Elaho (gemini-ios)	iOS	Mobile App	MPL 2.0	Swift
Elpher		GUI (Emacs)	GPL 3.0	Emacs Lisp
Eva		GUI (GTK)	MIT	Rust, GTK
Fafi		GUI	MIT	Racket
gemget		Terminal (CLI), noninteractive	MIT	Go
GemiNaut	Windows	GUI	GPL 3.0	C# for Microsoft Windows
gemini.filter.dpi		Plugin (Dillo)	MIT	Go
Geopard		GUI (GTK)	GPL 3.0	Rust, GTK
gmni		Terminal (CLI)	GPL 3.0	C
gplaces	Linux	Terminal (CLI)	GPL 3.0 or later	C
Jimmy	macOS	App	MIT	Swift
Kristall		GUI (Qt)	GPL 2.0	C++, Qt
Lagrange	Windows, macOS, Linux, iOS, Android	GUI	2 Clause BSD	C, SDL
Moonlander	Linux	GUI (GTK)	MIT	Rust, GTK
Offpunk		Terminal (CLI)	AGPL	Python
Rocketeer	iOS, macOS	App		Swift
Rosy Crow	Android	Mobile App	MIT	C#, MAUI
Seren	Android	Mobile App		Kotlin
SpaceMonkey	Linux	GUI, Mobile App	MIT	Go, GTK
Starfish	elementary OS/Linux	GUI	GPL 3.0	Vala, GTK
Tinmop		Terminal (TUI) or GUI	GPL 3.0+	Common lisp
Telescope	BSD, Linux, macOS	Terminal (TUI)	ISC	C
Twin Peaks	Windows	GUI	GPL 3.0	C#
VIRGIL99	TI-99	Terminal		Assembly language

The Gemini software list covers client, server, libraries, and tools. Gemini's founder, Solderpunk, created a client for the protocol called AV-98. Gemini-to-HTTP proxy server gateways such as Mozz.us can be used by web browsers lacking Gemini support.

== See also ==
- Text-based web browser
