= Boolean operation =

Boolean operation or Boolean operator may refer to:

- Boolean function, a function whose arguments and result assume values from a two-element set
  - Boolean operation (Boolean algebra), a logical operation in Boolean algebra (AND, OR and NOT)
  - Boolean operator (computer programming), part of a Boolean expression in a computer programming language
  - An operation or operator as characterized in the logical truth table
  - Logical operator, in logic, a logical constant used to connect two or more formulas
- Set operation (Boolean), a set-theoretic operation in the algebra of sets (union, intersection, and complementation)
  - Boolean operations on polygons, an application to polygon sets in computer graphics
