= Links (web browser) =

Web browser

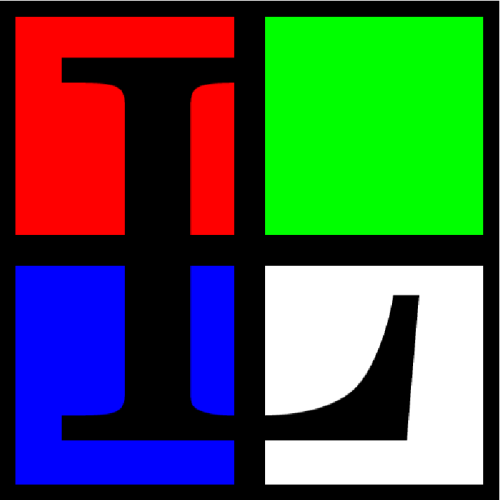

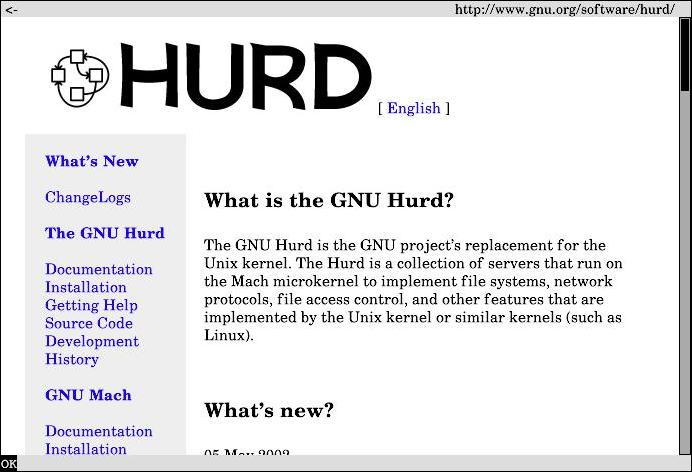
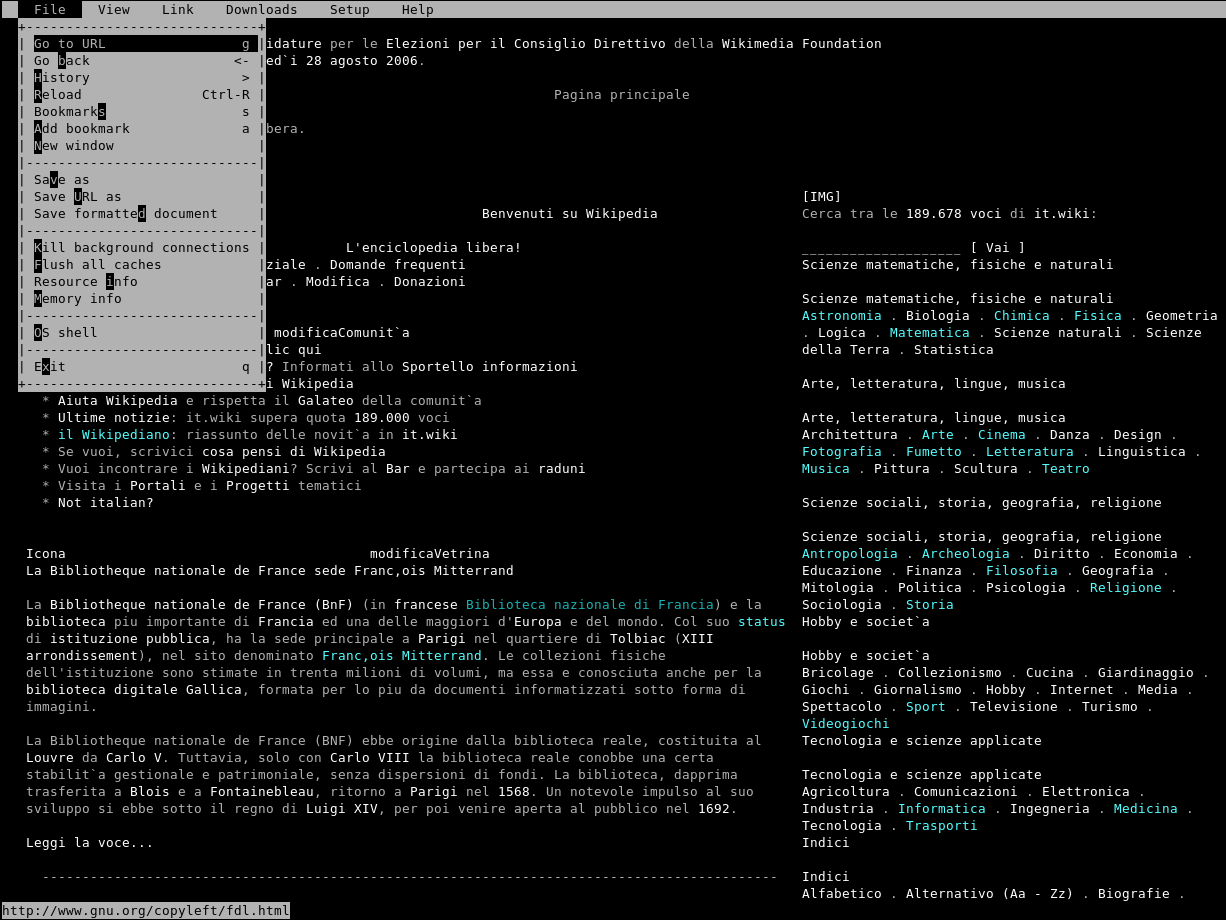
- Screenshot of the Links Browser.
- Developer: Mikuláš Patočka
- Release: 1999; 27 years ago
- Stable release: 2.30 / 27 July 2024
- Preview release: None (N/A) [±]
- Written in: C
- Operating system: Unix-like, Windows, macOS, OS/2, OpenVMS, DOS, AmigaOS, MorphOS
- Type: Web browser
- License: GPL-2.0-or-later
- Website: links.twibright.com

Links is a free software text and graphical web browser with a pull-down menu system. It renders complex pages, has partial HTML 4.0 support (including tables, frames, and support for UTF-8), supports color and monochrome terminals, and allows horizontal scrolling.

It is intended for users who want to retain many typical elements of graphical user interfaces (pop-up windows, menus, etc.) in a text-only environment.

The original version of Links was developed by Mikuláš Patočka in the Czech Republic. His group, "Twibright Labs", later developed version 2 of the Links browser, which displays graphics, and renders fonts in different sizes (with spatial anti-aliasing), but no longer supports JavaScript (it used to, up to version 2.1pre28). The resulting browser is very fast, but does not display many pages as intended. The graphical mode works even on Unix systems without the X Window System or any other window environment, using either SVGAlib or the framebuffer of the system's graphics card.

== Forks ==
=== ELinks ===
Experimental/Enhanced Links (ELinks) is a fork of Links led by Petr Baudis. It is based on Links 0.9. It has a more open development and incorporates patches from other Links versions (such as additional extension scripting in Lua) and from Internet users.

=== Hacked Links ===
Hacked Links is another version of the Links browser which has merged some of ELinks' features into Links 2.

Andrey Mirtchovski has ported it to Plan 9 from Bell Labs. It is considered a good browser on that operating system, though some users have complained about its inability to cut and paste with the Plan 9 snarf buffer.

As of April 2016, the last release of Hacked Links is that of July 9, 2003, with some further changes unreleased.

=== Other ===
Links was also ported to run on the Sony PSP platform as PSPRadio by Rafael Cabezas with the last version (2.1pre23_PSP_r1261) released on February 6, 2007.

The BeOS port was updated by François Revol who also added GUI support. It also runs on Haiku.
