= Alexa Internet =

American web traffic analysis company (1996–2022)

Alexa Internet, Inc.

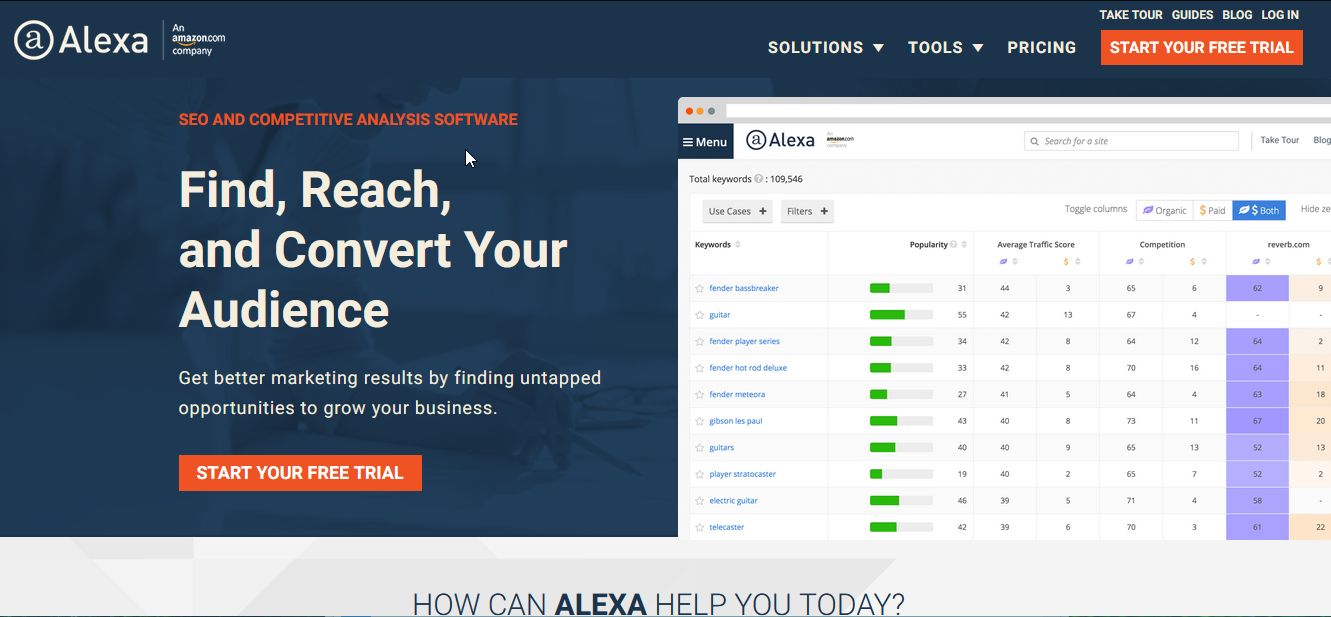
- Home page as of May 1, 2022
- Website type: Web traffic and ranking
- Available in: English
- Headquarters: San Francisco, California, United States
- Owner: Amazon
- Creators: Brewster Kahle; Bruce Gilliat
- President: Andrew Ramm
- Key people: Andrew Ramm (president and GM); Dave Sherfese (vice president)
- Industry: Web traffic
- Products: Alexa Web Search (discontinued 2008); Alexa toolbar
- Website: alexa.com at the Wayback Machine (archived 2008-03-09)
- Registration: Optional
- Launched: April 1, 1996; 30 years ago
- Current status: Discontinued (as of May 1, 2022; 4 years ago)

Alexa Internet, Inc. was an American web traffic analysis company based in San Francisco, California. It was founded as an independent company by Brewster Kahle and Bruce Gilliat in 1996. Alexa provided web traffic data, global rankings, and other information on over 30 million websites. It was acquired by Amazon in 1999 for $250 million in stock. Amazon discontinued the Alexa Internet service on May 1, 2022.

Alexa estimated website traffic based on a sample of millions of Internet users using browser extensions as well as from sites that had chosen to install an Alexa script. As of 2020, its website was visited by over 400 million people every month.

== Operations and history ==
=== 1996–1999 ===
Alexa Internet was founded in April 1996 by Brewster Kahle and Bruce Gilliat. The company's name was chosen in homage to the Library of Alexandria in Ptolemaic Egypt, drawing a parallel between the largest repository of knowledge in the ancient world and the potential of the Internet to become a similar store of knowledge. Alexa initially offered a toolbar that gave Internet users suggestions on where to go next based on the traffic patterns of its user community. The company also offered context for each site visited: to whom it was registered, how many pages it had, how many other sites pointed to it, and how frequently it was updated.

Alexa's operations grew to include the archiving of web pages as they are "crawled" and examined by an automated computer program (nicknamed a "bot" or "web crawler"). This database served as the basis for the creation of the Internet Archive, accessible through the Wayback Machine. In 1998, the company donated a copy of the archive, two terabytes in size, to the Library of Congress. Alexa continued to supply the Internet Archive with web crawls. In 1999, as the company moved away from its original vision of providing an "intelligent" search engine, Alexa was acquired by Amazon.com for approximately US$250 million in Amazon stock.

=== 2000–2009 ===
Alexa began a partnership with Google in early 2002 and with the web directory DMOZ in January 2003. In December 2005, Alexa opened its extensive search index and Web-crawling facilities to third-party programs through a comprehensive set of Web services and APIs (Alexa Web Information Service (AWIS)). These could be used, for instance, to construct vertical search engines that could run on Alexa's servers or elsewhere. In May 2006, Google was replaced by Windows Live Search as a provider of search results. In December 2006, Amazon released Alexa Image Search. Built in-house, it was the first major application built on the company's Web platform. In May 2007, Alexa changed their API to limit comparisons to three websites, reduce the size of embedded graphs in Flash, and add mandatory embedded BritePic advertisements.

In April 2007, the company filed a lawsuit, Alexa v. Hornbaker, to stop trademark infringement by the Statsaholic service. In the lawsuit, Alexa alleged that Ron Hornbaker was stealing traffic graphs for profit and that the primary purpose of his site was to display graphs that were generated by Alexa's servers. Hornbaker had removed the term Alexa from his service name on March 19, 2007. On November 27, 2008, Amazon announced that Alexa Web Search was no longer accepting new customers and that the service would be deprecated or discontinued for existing customers on January 26, 2009. Thereafter, Alexa became a purely analytics-focused company.

On March 31, 2009, Alexa revealed a major website redesign. The redesigned site provided new web traffic metrics, including average page views per individual user, bounce rate (the rate of users who come to and then leave a webpage), and user time on the website. In the following weeks, Alexa added more features, including visitor demographics, clickstream, and web search traffic statistics.

=== 2010–2020 ===
During this period, Alexa's algorithm had been evolving along with it. Statistics projection and the use of their technology associated with a large network of certificated websites allowed them to keep ahead of the website traffic metrics around the world. Because of this, many large sites were using it as the main reference for popularity on the internet.

On November 6, 2014, Amazon announced Amazon Alexa, their virtual assistant. Amazon already had trademarks for Alexa due to their ownership of Alexa Internet, Inc.

=== End of service ===
On December 8, 2021, Amazon announced the cessation of its website ranking and competitive analysis service, which had been available to the public for more than 25 years. From that day on, it was no longer possible to create accounts or buy subscriptions on the service. The statement first published on its website specified the total cessation of the service as of May 1, 2022. Existing subscriptions were available until that date, after which everything on the site was removed and replaced with an "End of Service Notice".

The alexa.com domain is now a landing page for Amazon Alexa products.

== Alexa Traffic Rank ==
A key metric published from Alexa Internet analytics was the Alexa Traffic Rank, also simply known as Alexa Rank. It was also referred to as Global Rank by Alexa Internet and was designed to be an estimate of a website's popularity. As of May 2018, Alexa Internet's tooltip for Global Rank said the rank is calculated from a combination of daily visitors and page views on a website over a three-month period.

The Alexa Traffic Rank could be used to monitor the popularity trend of a website and compare the popularity of different websites.

The traffic rank used to be determined from data recollected from users that had the Alexa toolbar installed on their browser. As of 2020, Alexa did not use a toolbar; instead, it used data from users that had installed any of a number of browser extensions and from websites that had the Alexa script installed on their webpages.

== Tracking ==
=== Browser extensions ===
Alexa replaced their toolbar with browser extensions. These extensions were made available for Google Chrome and Firefox browsers. The Alexa browser extension displayed the Alexa Traffic Rank for websites, showed related websites, provided search analytics, and quickly allowed users to view the Internet Archive through the Wayback Machine. They were last updated in May 2020, two years prior to the service's closure.

==== Toolbar ====
Alexa used to rank sites based primarily on tracking a sample set of Internet traffic—users of its browser toolbar for the Internet Explorer, Firefox and Google Chrome web browsers. The Alexa Toolbar included a popup blocker (which stops unwanted ads), a search box, links to Amazon.com and the Alexa homepage, and the Alexa ranking of the website that the user is visiting. It also allowed the user to rate the website and view links to external, relevant websites. In early 2005, Alexa stated that there had been 10 million downloads of the toolbar, though the company did not provide statistics about active usage. Originally, web pages were only ranked amongst users who had the Alexa Toolbar installed, and could be biased if a specific audience subgroup was reluctant to take part in the rankings. This caused some controversies over how representative Alexa's user base was of typical Internet behavior, especially for less-visited sites. In 2007, Michael Arrington provided examples of Alexa rankings known to contradict data from the comScore web analytics service, including ranking YouTube ahead of Google. In 2021 John Mueller from Google confirmed again that Google does not use Amazon Alexa Rank.

==== Search Status ====
Until 2007, a third-party-supplied Mozilla plug-in called Search Status for the Firefox browser served as the only option for Firefox users after Amazon abandoned its A9 toolbar. On July 16, 2007, Alexa released an official toolbar for Firefox called Sparky. On 16 April 2008, many users reported drastic shifts in their Alexa rankings. Alexa confirmed this later in the day with an announcement that they had released an updated ranking system, claiming that they would now take into account more sources of data "beyond Alexa Toolbar users".

=== Certified statistics ===
Using the Alexa Pro service, website owners could sign up for "certified statistics", which allowed Alexa more access to a website's traffic data. Site owners input JavaScript code on each page of their website that, if permitted by the user's security and privacy settings, ran and sent traffic data to Alexa, allowing Alexa to display—or not display, depending on the owner's preference—more accurate statistics such as total page views and unique page views.

== See also ==
- Google Analytics – Web analytics service from Google
- List of most-visited websites
- List of search engines
- List of web directories
- Similarweb
