= History of the World Wide Web =

World Wide Web
- The Web's former logo by Robert Cailliau
- Inventor: Tim Berners-Lee
- Inception: 12 March 1989; 37 years ago

The World Wide Web ("WWW", "W3" or simply "the Web") is a global information medium that users can access via computers connected to the Internet. The term is often used as a synonym for the Internet, but the Web is a service that operates over the Internet, just as email and videoconferencing do. The history of the Internet and the history of hypertext date back significantly further than that of the World Wide Web.

Tim Berners-Lee invented the World Wide Web while working at CERN in 1989. He proposed a "universal linked information system" using several concepts and technologies, the most fundamental of which was the connections that existed between information. He developed the first web server, the first web browser, and a document formatting protocol, called Hypertext Markup Language (HTML). After publishing the markup language in 1991, and releasing the browser source code for public use in 1993, many other web browsers were soon developed, with Marc Andreessen's Mosaic (later Netscape Navigator) being particularly easy to use and install, and often credited with sparking the Internet boom of the 1990s. It was a graphical browser which ran on several popular office and home computers, bringing multimedia content to non-technical users by including images and text on the same page.

Websites for use by the general public began to emerge in 1993–94. This spurred competition in server and browser software, highlighted in the Browser wars which was initially dominated by Netscape Navigator and Internet Explorer. Following the complete removal of commercial restrictions on Internet use by 1995, commercialization of the Web amidst macroeconomic factors led to the dot-com boom and bust in the late 1990s and early 2000s.

The features of HTML evolved over time, leading to HTML version 2 in 1995, HTML3 and HTML4 in 1997, and HTML5 in 2014. The language was extended with advanced formatting in Cascading Style Sheets (CSS) and with programming capability by JavaScript. AJAX programming delivered dynamic content to users, which sparked a new era in Web design, styled Web 2.0. The use of social media, becoming commonplace in the 2010s, allowed users to compose multimedia content without programming skills, making the Web ubiquitous in everyday life.

== Background ==
=== Precursors ===
The underlying concept of hypertext as a user interface paradigm originated in projects in the 1960s, from research such as the Hypertext Editing System (HES) by Andries van Dam at Brown University, IBM Generalized Markup Language, Ted Nelson's Project Xanadu, and Douglas Engelbart's oN-Line System (NLS). Both Nelson and Engelbart were in turn inspired by Vannevar Bush's microfilm-based memex, which was described in the 1945 essay "As We May Think". Other precursors were FRESS and Intermedia. Paul Otlet's project Mundaneum has also been named as an early 20th-century precursor of the Web.

=== ENQUIRE ===
In 1980, Tim Berners-Lee, at the European Organization for Nuclear Research (CERN) in Switzerland, built ENQUIRE, as a personal database of people and software models, but also as a way to experiment with hypertext; each new page of information in ENQUIRE had to be linked to another page. When Berners-Lee built ENQUIRE, the ideas developed by Bush, Engelbart, and Nelson did not influence his work, since he was not aware of them. However, as Berners-Lee began to refine his ideas, the work of these predecessors would later help to confirm the legitimacy of his concept.

During the 1980s, many packet-switched data networks emerged based on various communication protocols (see Protocol Wars). One of these standards was the Internet protocol suite, which is often referred to as TCP/IP. As the Internet grew through the 1980s, many people realized the increasing need to be able to find and organize files and use information. By 1985, the Domain Name System (upon which the Uniform Resource Locator is built) came into being. Many small, self-contained hypertext systems were created, such as Apple Computer's HyperCard (1987).

=== Return to CERN ===
Berners-Lee's contract in 1980 was from June to December, but in 1984 he returned to CERN in a permanent role, and considered its problems of information management: physicists from around the world needed to share data, yet they lacked common machines and any shared presentation software. Shortly after Berners-Lee's return to CERN, TCP/IP protocols were installed on Unix machines at the institution, turning it into the largest Internet site in Europe. In 1988, the first direct IP connection between Europe and North America was established and Berners-Lee began to openly discuss the possibility of a web-like system at CERN. He was inspired by a book, Enquire Within upon Everything. Many online services existed before the creation of the World Wide Web, such as CompuServe, Usenet, Internet Relay Chat, Telnet and bulletin board systems. Before the internet, UUCP was used for online services such as e-mail, and BITNET was also another popular network.

== 1989–1991: Origins ==
=== CERN ===
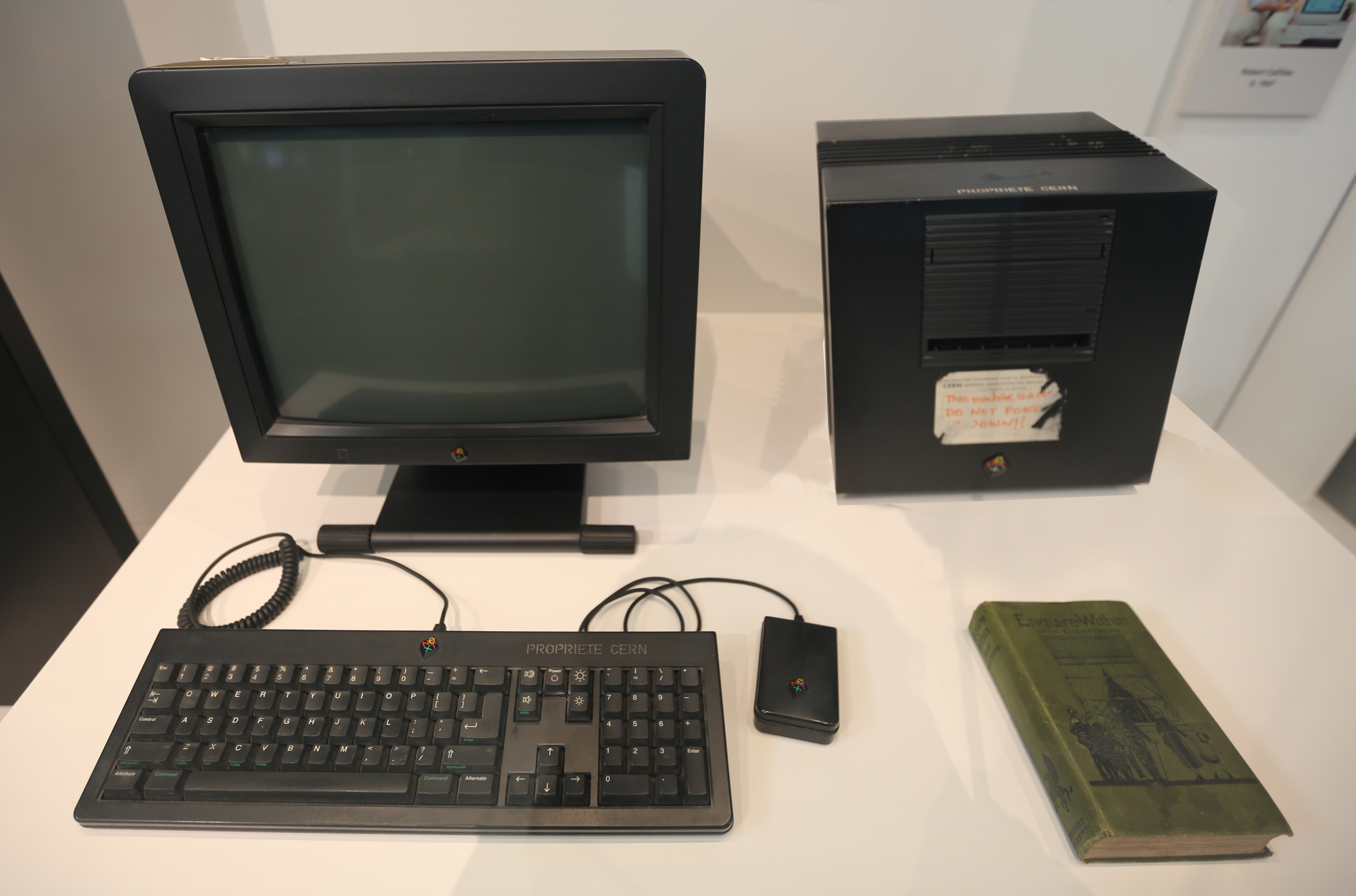
The NeXT Computer used by Tim Berners-Lee at CERN became the first Web server.

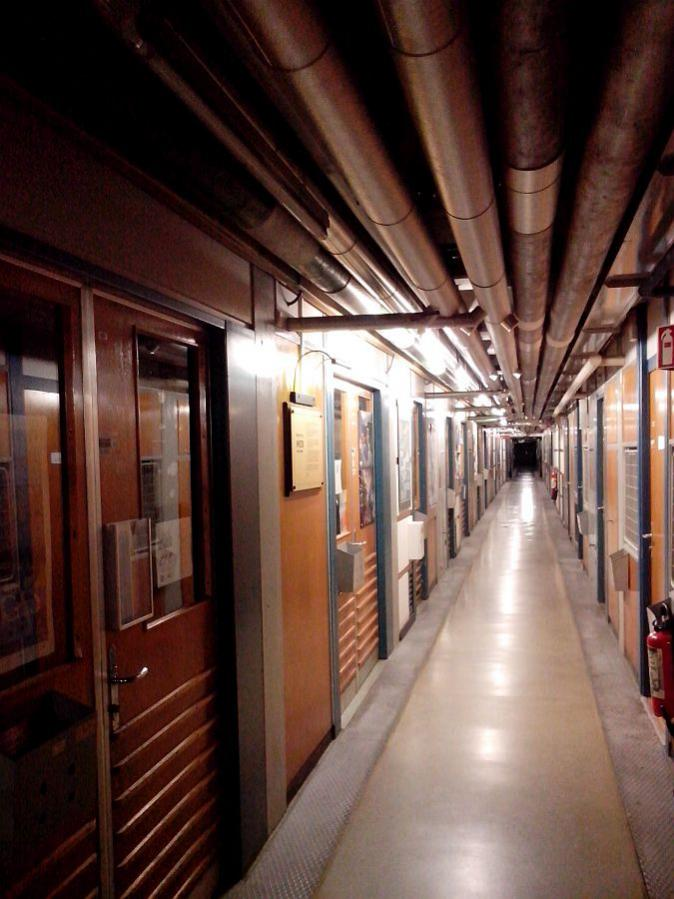
The corridor where the World Wide Web was born, on the ground floor of building No. 1 at CERN

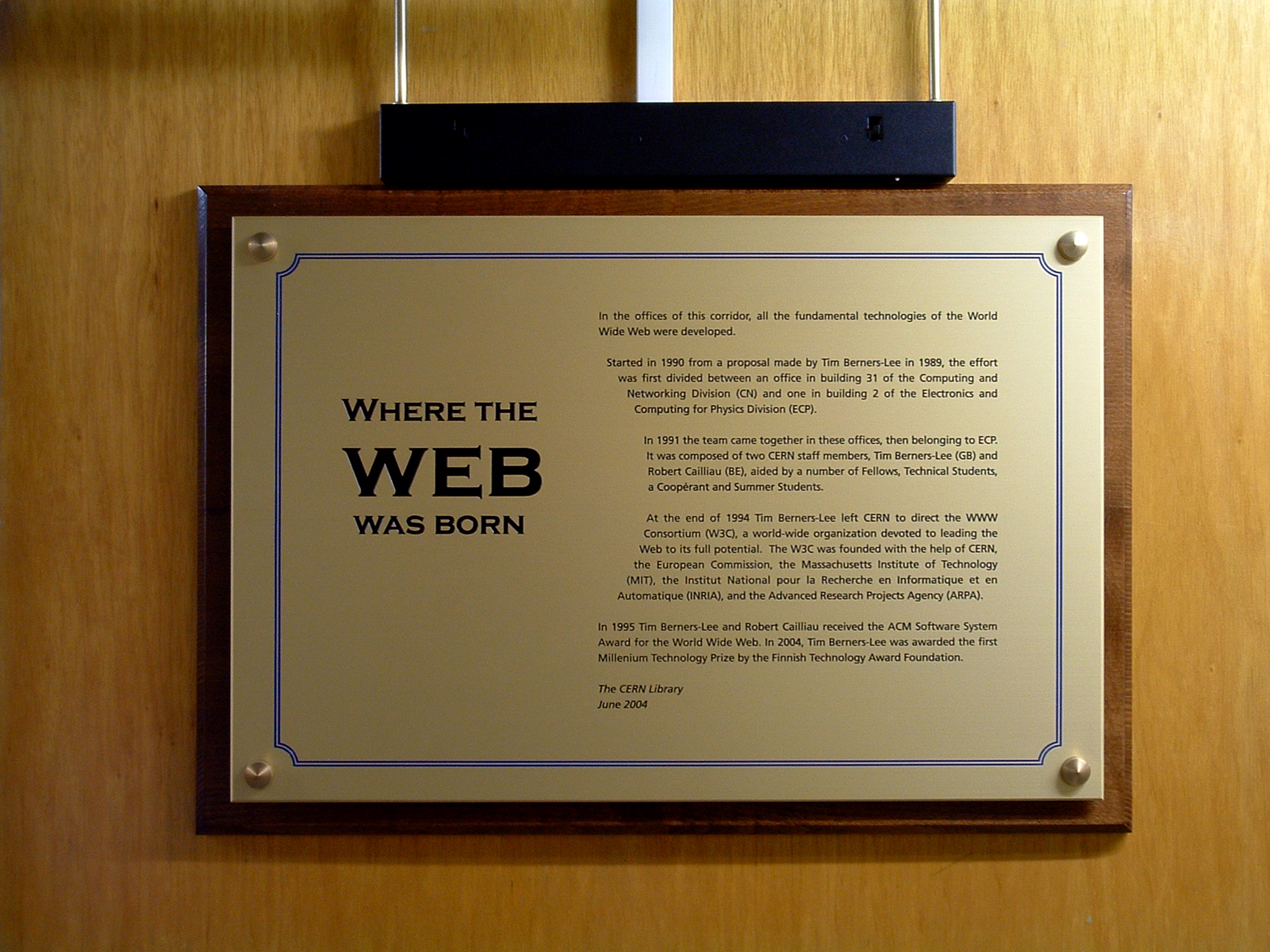
Where the WEB was born

While working at CERN, Tim Berners-Lee became frustrated with the inefficiencies and difficulties posed by finding information stored on different computers. On 12 March 1989, he submitted a memorandum, titled "Information Management: A Proposal", to the management at CERN. (At the beginning of chapter 12 of his 2025 book, Berners-Lee confides that "the first document reads only 'March 1989'" — that he gave "12 March — which is actually my mother's birthday.") The proposal used the term "web" and was based on "a large hypertext database with typed links". It described a system called "Mesh" that referenced ENQUIRE, the database and software project he had built in 1980, with a more elaborate information management system based on links embedded as text: "Imagine, then, the references in this document all being associated with the network address of the thing to which they referred, so that while reading this document, you could skip to them with a click of the mouse." Such a system, he explained, could be referred to using one of the existing meanings of the word hypertext, a term that he says was coined in the 1950s. Berners-Lee notes the possibility of multimedia documents that include graphics, speech and video, which he terms hypermedia.

Although the proposal attracted little interest, Berners-Lee was encouraged by his manager, Mike Sendall, to begin implementing his system on a newly acquired NeXT workstation. He considered several names, including Information Mesh, The Information Mine or Mine of Information, but settled on World Wide Web. Berners-Lee found an enthusiastic supporter in his colleague and fellow hypertext enthusiast Robert Cailliau who began to promote the proposed system throughout CERN. Berners-Lee and Cailliau pitched Berners-Lee's ideas to the European Conference on Hypertext Technology in September 1990, but found no vendors who could appreciate his vision.

Berners-Lee's breakthrough was to marry hypertext to the Internet. In his book Weaving The Web, he explains that he had repeatedly suggested to members of both technical communities that a marriage between the two technologies was possible. But, when no one took up his invitation, he finally assumed the project himself. In the process, he developed three essential technologies:

- a system of globally unique identifiers for resources on the Web and elsewhere, the universal document identifier (UDI), later known as uniform resource locator (URL);
- the publishing language Hypertext Markup Language (HTML);
- the Hypertext Transfer Protocol (HTTP).

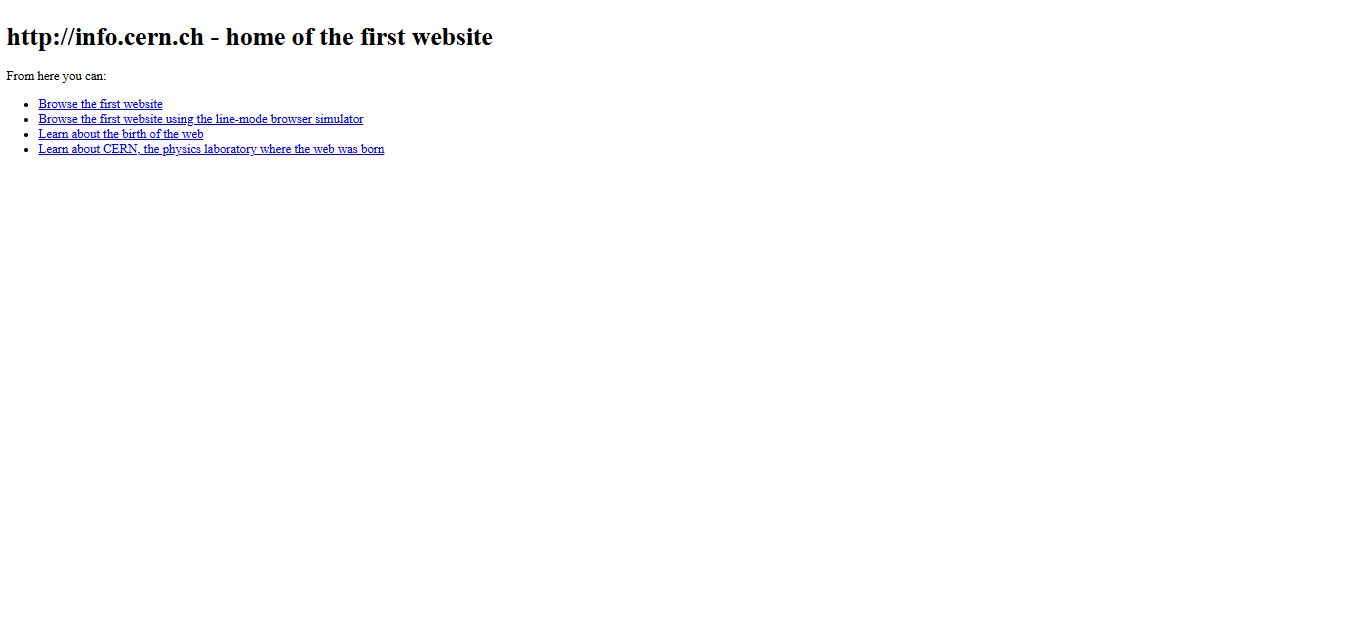
info.cern.ch, the first website, in 2025

With help from Cailliau he published a more formal proposal on 12 November 1990 to build a "hypertext project" called WorldWideWeb (abbreviated "W3") as a "web" of "hypertext documents" to be viewed by "browsers" using a client–server architecture. The proposal was modelled after the Standard Generalized Markup Language (SGML) reader Dynatext by Electronic Book Technology, a spin-off from the Institute for Research in Information and Scholarship at Brown University. The Dynatext system, licensed by CERN, was considered too expensive and had an inappropriate licensing policy for use in the general high energy physics community, namely a fee for each document and each document alteration.

At this point HTML and HTTP had already been in development for about two months and the first web server was about a month from completing its first successful test. Berners-Lee's proposal estimated that a read-only Web would be developed within three months and that it would take six months to achieve "the creation of new links and new material by readers, [so that] authorship becomes universal" as well as "the automatic notification of a reader when new material of interest to him/her has become available".

By December 1990, Berners-Lee and his work team had built all the tools necessary for a working Web: the HyperText Transfer Protocol (HTTP), the HyperText Markup Language (HTML), the first web browser (named WorldWideWeb, which was also a web editor), the first web server (later known as CERN httpd) and the first web site (https://info.cern.ch/) containing the first web pages that described the project itself was published on 20 December 1990. The browser could access Usenet newsgroups and FTP files as well. A NeXT Computer was used by Berners-Lee as the web server and also to write the web browser.

Working with Berners-Lee at CERN, Nicola Pellow developed the first cross-platform web browser, the Line Mode Browser.

== 1991–1994: The Web goes public, early growth ==
=== Initial launch ===
In January 1991, the first web servers outside CERN were switched on. On 6 August 1991, Berners-Lee published a short summary of the World Wide Web project on the newsgroup alt.hypertext, inviting collaborators.

Paul Kunz from the Stanford Linear Accelerator Center (SLAC) visited CERN in September 1991, and was captivated by the Web. He brought the NeXT software back to SLAC, where librarian Louise Addis adapted it for the VM/CMS operating system on the IBM mainframe as a way to host the SPIRES-HEP database and display SLAC's catalog of online documents. This was the first web server outside of Europe and the first in North America.

The World Wide Web had several differences from other hypertext systems available at the time. The Web required only unidirectional links rather than bidirectional ones, making it possible for someone to link to another resource without action by the owner of that resource. It also significantly reduced the difficulty of implementing web servers and browsers (in comparison to earlier systems), but in turn, presented the chronic problem of link rot.

=== Early browsers ===
The WorldWideWeb browser only ran on NeXTSTEP operating system. This shortcoming was discussed in January 1992, and alleviated in early 1992 by the release of ViolaWWW, created by Pei-Yuan Wei, and later by Erwise, developed by students at the Helsinki University of Technology, and MidasWWW, developed by Tony Johnson at SLAC. ViolaWWW was the recommended browser at CERN during this time. Both programs ran on the X Window System for Unix. In 1992, the first tests between browsers on different platforms were concluded successfully between buildings 513 and 31 in CERN, between browsers on the NexT station and the X11-ported Mosaic browser. ViolaWWW became the recommended browser at CERN. To encourage use within CERN, Bernd Pollermann put the CERN telephone directory on the web—previously users had to log onto the mainframe in order to look up phone numbers. The Web was successful at CERN and spread to other scientific and academic institutions.

Students at the University of Kansas adapted an existing text-only hypertext browser, Lynx, to access the web in 1993. Lynx was available on Unix and DOS.

=== From Gopher to the WWW ===
In the early 1990s, Internet-based projects such as Archie, Gopher, Wide Area Information Servers (WAIS), and the FTP Archive list attempted to create ways to organize distributed data. Gopher was a document browsing system for the Internet, released in 1991 by the University of Minnesota. Invented by Mark P. McCahill, it became the first commonly used hypertext interface to the Internet. While Gopher menu items were not sent as hypertext, they were rendered as hypertext links, that would allow the user to navigate to the resource by following the link. In less than a year, there were hundreds of Gopher servers. It offered a viable alternative to the World Wide Web in the early 1990s and the consensus was that Gopher would be the primary way that people would interact with the Internet. However, in 1993, the University of Minnesota declared that Gopher was proprietary and would have to be licensed.

In response, on 30 April 1993, CERN announced that the World Wide Web would be free to anyone, with no fees due, and released their code into the public domain. This made it possible to develop servers and clients independently and to add extensions without licensing restrictions. Coming two months after the announcement that the server implementation of the Gopher protocol was no longer free to use, this spurred the development of various browsers which precipitated a rapid shift away from Gopher. By releasing Berners-Lee's invention for public use, CERN encouraged and enabled its widespread use.

Early websites intermingled links for both the HTTP web protocol and the Gopher protocol, which provided access to content through hypertext menus presented as a file system rather than through HTML files. Early Web users would navigate either by bookmarking popular directory pages or by consulting updated lists such as the NCSA "What's New" page. Some sites were also indexed by WAIS, enabling users to submit full-text searches similar to the capability later provided by search engines.

After 1993 the World Wide Web saw many advances to indexing and ease of access through search engines, which often neglected Gopher and Gopherspace. As its popularity increased through ease of use, incentives for commercial investment in the Web also grew. By the middle of 1994, the Web was outcompeting Gopher and the other browsing systems for the Internet.

=== NCSA ===
The National Center for Supercomputing Applications (NCSA) at the University of Illinois at Urbana–Champaign (UIUC) established a website in November 1992. After Marc Andreessen, a student at UIUC, was shown ViolaWWW in late 1992, he began work on Mosaic with another UIUC student Eric Bina, using funding from the High-Performance Computing and Communications Initiative, a US-federal research and development program initiated by US Senator Al Gore. Andreessen and Bina released a Unix version of the browser in February 1993; Mac and Windows versions followed in August 1993. The browser gained popularity due to its strong support of integrated multimedia, and the authors' rapid response to user bug reports and recommendations for new features. Historians generally agree that the 1993 introduction of the Mosaic web browser was a turning point for the World Wide Web.

Before the release of Mosaic in 1993, graphics were not commonly mixed with text in web pages, and the Web was less popular than older protocols such as Gopher and WAIS. Mosaic could display inline images and submit forms for Windows, Macintosh and X-Windows. NCSA also developed HTTPd, a Unix web server that used the Common Gateway Interface to process forms and Server Side Includes for dynamic content. Both the client and server were free to use with no restrictions. Mosaic was an immediate hit; its graphical user interface allowed the Web to become by far the most popular protocol on the Internet. Within a year, web traffic surpassed Gopher's. Wired declared that Mosaic made non-Internet online services obsolete, and the Web became the preferred interface for accessing the Internet.

=== Early growth ===
The World Wide Web enabled the spread of information over the Internet through an easy-to-use and flexible format. It thus played an important role in popularising use of the Internet. Although the two terms are sometimes conflated in popular use, World Wide Web is not synonymous with Internet. The Web is an information space containing hyperlinked documents and other resources, identified by their URIs. It is implemented as both client and server software using Internet protocols such as TCP/IP and HTTP.

In keeping with its origins at CERN, early adopters of the Web were primarily university-based scientific departments or physics laboratories such as SLAC and Fermilab. By January 1993 there were fifty web servers across the world. By October 1993 there were over five hundred servers online, including some notable websites.

Practical media distribution and streaming media over the Web was made possible by advances in data compression, due to the impractically high bandwidth requirements of uncompressed media. Following the introduction of the Web, several media formats based on discrete cosine transform (DCT) were introduced for practical media distribution and streaming over the Web, including the MPEG video format in 1991 and the JPEG image format in 1992. The high level of image compression made JPEG a good format for compensating slow Internet access speeds, typical in the age of dial-up Internet access. JPEG became the most widely used image format for the World Wide Web. A DCT variation, the modified discrete cosine transform (MDCT) algorithm, led to the development of MP3, which was introduced in 1991 and became the first popular audio format on the Web.

In 1992 the Computing and Networking Department of CERN, headed by David Williams, withdrew support of Berners-Lee's work. A two-page email sent by Williams stated that the work of Berners-Lee, with the goal of creating a facility to exchange information such as results and comments from CERN experiments to the scientific community, was not the core activity of CERN and was a misallocation of CERN's IT resources. Following this decision, Tim Berners-Lee left CERN for the Massachusetts Institute of Technology (MIT), where he continued to develop HTTP.

The first Microsoft Windows browser was Cello, written by Thomas R. Bruce for the Legal Information Institute at Cornell Law School to provide legal information, since access to Windows was more widespread amongst lawyers than access to Unix. Cello was released in June 1993.

== 1994–2004: Open standards, going global ==
The rate of web site deployment increased sharply around the world, and fostered development of international standards for protocols and content formatting. Berners-Lee continued to stay involved in guiding web standards, such as the markup languages to compose web pages, and he advocated his vision of a Semantic Web (sometimes known as Web 3.0) based around machine-readability and interoperability standards.

=== World Wide Web Conference ===
In May 1994, the first International WWW Conference, organized by Robert Cailliau, was held at CERN; the conference has been held every year since.

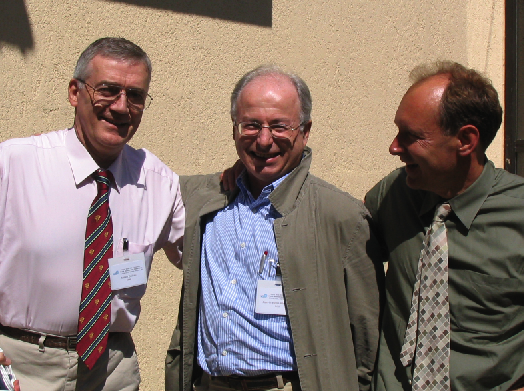
Robert Cailliau, Jean-François Abramatic, and Tim Berners-Lee at the tenth anniversary of the World Wide Web Consortium

=== World Wide Web Consortium ===
The World Wide Web Consortium (W3C) was founded by Tim Berners-Lee after he left the European Organization for Nuclear Research (CERN) in September/October 1994 in order to create open standards for the Web. It was founded at the Massachusetts Institute of Technology Laboratory for Computer Science (MIT/LCS) with support from the Defense Advanced Research Projects Agency (DARPA), which had pioneered the Internet. A year later, a second site was founded at INRIA (a French national computer research lab) with support from the European Commission; and in 1996, a third continental site was created in Japan at Keio University.

W3C comprised various companies that were willing to create standards and recommendations to improve the quality of the Web. Berners-Lee made the Web available freely, with no patent and no royalties due. The W3C decided that its standards must be based on royalty-free technology, so they can be easily adopted by anyone. Netscape and Microsoft, in the middle of a browser war, ignored the W3C and added elements to HTML ad hoc (e.g., blink and marquee). Finally, in 1995, Netscape and Microsoft came to their senses and agreed to abide by the W3C's standard.

The W3C published the standard for HTML 4 in 1997, which included Cascading Style Sheets (CSS), giving designers more control over the appearance of web pages without the need for additional HTML tags. The W3C could not enforce compliance so none of the browsers were fully compliant. This frustrated web designers who formed the Web Standards Project (WaSP) in 1998 with the goal of cajoling compliance with standards. A List Apart and CSS Zen Garden were influential websites that promoted good design and adherence to standards. Nevertheless, AOL halted development of Netscape and Microsoft was slow to update IE. Mozilla and Apple both released browsers that aimed to be more standards compliant (Firefox and Safari), but were unable to dislodge IE as the dominant browser.

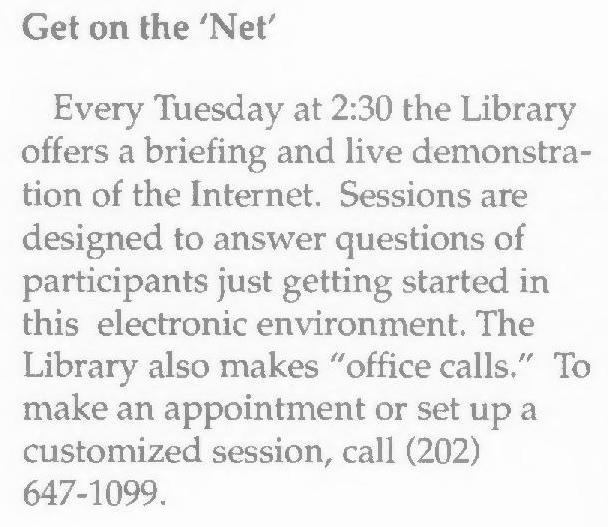
1997 advertisement in State Magazine by the US State Department Library for sessions introducing the then-unfamiliar Web

=== Commercialization, dot-com boom and bust, aftermath ===
As the Web grew in the mid-1990s, web directories and primitive search engines were created to index pages and allow people to find things. Commercial use restrictions on the Internet were lifted in 1995 when NSFNET was shut down.

In the US, the online service America Online (AOL) offered their users a connection to the Internet via their own internal browser, using a dial-up Internet connection. In January 1994, Yahoo! was founded by Jerry Yang and David Filo, then students at Stanford University. Yahoo! Directory became the first popular web directory. Yahoo! Search, launched the same year, was the first popular search engine on the World Wide Web. Yahoo! became the quintessential example of a first mover on the Web.

Online shopping began to emerge with the launch of Amazon's shopping site by Jeff Bezos in 1995 and eBay by Pierre Omidyar the same year.

By 1994, Marc Andreessen's Netscape Navigator superseded Mosaic in popularity, holding the position for some time. Bill Gates outlined Microsoft's strategy to dominate the Internet in his Tidal Wave memo in 1995. With the release of Windows 95 and the popular Internet Explorer browser, many public companies began to develop a Web presence. At first, people mainly anticipated the possibilities of free publishing and instant worldwide information. By the late 1990s, the directory model had given way to search engines, corresponding with the rise of Google Search, which developed new approaches to relevancy ranking. Directory features, while still commonly available, became after-thoughts to search engines.

Netscape had a very successful IPO valuing the company at $2.9 billion despite the lack of profits and triggering the dot-com bubble. Increasing familiarity with the Web led to the growth of direct Web-based commerce (e-commerce) and instantaneous group communications worldwide. Many dot-com companies, displaying products on hypertext webpages, were added into the Web. Over the next 5 years, over a trillion dollars was raised to fund thousands of startups consisting of little more than a website.

During the dot-com boom, many companies vied to create a dominant web portal in the belief that such a website would best be able to attract a large audience that in turn would attract online advertising revenue. While most of these portals offered a search engine, they were not interested in encouraging users to find other websites and leave the portal and instead concentrated on "sticky" content. In contrast, Google was a stripped-down search engine that delivered superior results. It was a hit with users who switched from portals to Google. Furthermore, with AdWords, Google had an effective business model.

AOL bought Netscape in 1998. In spite of their early success, Netscape was unable to fend off Microsoft. Internet Explorer and a variety of other browsers almost completely replaced it.

Faster broadband internet connections replaced many dial-up connections from the beginning of the 2000s.

With the bursting of the dot-com bubble, many web portals either scaled back operations, floundered, or shut down entirely. AOL disbanded Netscape in 2003.

=== Web server software ===
Web server software was developed to allow computers to act as web servers. The first web servers supported only static files, such as HTML (and images), but now they commonly allow embedding of server side applications. Web framework software enabled building and deploying web applications. Content management systems (CMS) were developed to organize and facilitate collaborative content creation. Many of them were built on top of separate content management frameworks.

After Robert McCool joined Netscape, development on the NCSA HTTPd server languished. In 1995, Brian Behlendorf and Cliff Skolnick created a mailing list to coordinate efforts to fix bugs and make improvements to HTTPd. They called their version of HTTPd, Apache. Apache quickly became the dominant server on the Web. After adding support for modules, Apache was able to allow developers to handle web requests with a variety of languages including Perl, PHP and Python. Together with Linux and MySQL, it became known as the LAMP platform.

Following the success of Apache, the Apache Software Foundation was founded in 1999 and produced many open source web software projects in the same collaborative spirit.

=== Browser wars ===
After graduating from UIUC, Andreessen and Jim Clark, former CEO of Silicon Graphics, met and formed Mosaic Communications Corporation in April 1994 to develop the Mosaic Netscape browser commercially. The company later changed its name to Netscape, and the browser was developed further as Netscape Navigator, which soon became the dominant web client. They also released the Netsite Commerce web server which could handle SSL requests, thus enabling e-commerce on the Web. SSL became the standard method to encrypt web traffic. Navigator 1.0 also introduced cookies, but Netscape did not publicize this feature. Netscape followed up with Navigator 2 in 1995 introducing frames, Java applets and JavaScript. In 1998, Netscape made Navigator open source and launched Mozilla.

Microsoft licensed Mosaic from Spyglass and released Internet Explorer 1.0 that year and IE2 later the same year. IE2 added features pioneered at Netscape such as cookies, SSL, and JavaScript. The browser wars became a competition for dominance when Explorer was bundled with Windows. This led to the United States v. Microsoft Corporation antitrust lawsuit.

IE3, released in 1996, added support for Java applets, ActiveX, and CSS. At this point, Microsoft began bundling IE with Windows. IE3 managed to increase Microsoft's share of the browser market from under 10% to over 20%. IE4, released the following year, introduced Dynamic HTML, setting the stage for the Web 2.0 revolution. By 1998, IE was able to capture the majority of the desktop browser market. It would be the dominant browser for the next fourteen years.

Google released their Chrome browser in 2008 with the first JIT JavaScript engine, V8. Chrome overtook IE to become the dominant desktop browser in four years, and overtook Safari to become the dominant mobile browser in two. At the same time, Google open sourced Chrome's codebase as Chromium.

Ryan Dahl used Chromium's V8 engine in 2009 to power an event driven runtime system, Node.js, which allowed JavaScript code to be used on servers as well as browsers. This led to the development of new software stacks such as MEAN. Thanks to frameworks such as Electron, developers can bundle up node applications as standalone desktop applications such as Slack.

Acer and Samsung began selling Chromebooks, cheap laptops running ChromeOS capable of running web apps, in 2011. Over the next decade, more companies offered Chromebooks. Chromebooks outsold MacOS devices in 2020 to become the second most popular OS in the world.

Other notable web browsers emerged including Mozilla's Firefox, Opera's Opera browser and Apple's Safari.

=== Web 1.0 ===
Web 1.0 is a retronym referring to the first stage of the World Wide Web's evolution, from roughly 1989 to 2004. According to Graham Cormode and Balachander Krishnamurthy, "content creators were few in Web 1.0 with the vast majority of users simply acting as consumers of content". Personal web pages were common, consisting mainly of static pages hosted on ISP-run web servers, or on free web hosting services such as Tripod and the now-defunct GeoCities.

Some common design elements of a Web 1.0 site include:

- Static pages rather than dynamic HTML.
- Content provided from the server's filesystem rather than a relational database management system (RDBMS).
- Pages built using Server Side Includes or Common Gateway Interface (CGI) instead of a web application written in a dynamic programming language which allows the contents of the page to be modified such as Perl, PHP, Python, Ruby, solutions such as ASP.NET, JSP or node.js.
- The use of HTML 3.2-era elements such as frames and tables to position and align elements on a page. These were often used in combination with spacer GIFs. Frames are web pages embedded into other web pages, and spacer GIFs were transparent images used to force the content in the page to be displayed a certain way.
- Proprietary HTML extensions, such as the <blink> and <marquee> tags, introduced during the first browser war.
- Online guestbooks.
- GIF buttons, graphics (typically 88×31 pixels in size) promoting web browsers, operating systems, text editors and various other products.
- HTML forms sent via email. Support for server side scripting was rare on shared servers during this period. To provide a feedback mechanism for web site visitors, mailto forms were used. A user would fill in a form, and upon clicking the form's submit button, their email client would launch and attempt to send an email containing the form's details. The popularity and complications of the mailto protocol led browser developers to incorporate email clients into their browsers.

Terry Flew, in his third edition of New Media, described the differences between Web 1.0 and Web 2.0 as a

"move from personal websites to blogs and blog site aggregation, from publishing to participation, from web content as the outcome of large up-front investment to an ongoing and interactive process, and from content management systems to links based on "tagging" website content using keywords (folksonomy)."

Flew believed these factors formed the trends that resulted in the onset of the Web 2.0 "craze".

== 2004–present: The Web as platform, ubiquity ==
=== Web 2.0 ===
Web pages were initially conceived as structured documents based upon HTML. They could include images, video, and other content, although the use of media was initially relatively limited and the content was mainly static. By the mid-2000s, new approaches to sharing and exchanging content, such as blogs and RSS, rapidly gained acceptance on the Web. The video-sharing website YouTube launched the concept of user-generated content. As new technologies made it easier to create websites that behaved dynamically, the Web attained greater ease of use and gained a sense of interactivity which ushered in a period of rapid popularization. This new era also brought into existence social networking websites, such as Friendster, MySpace, Facebook, and Twitter, and photo- and video-sharing websites such as Flickr and, later, Instagram which gained users rapidly and became a central part of youth culture. Wikipedia's user-edited content quickly displaced the professionally-written Microsoft Encarta. The popularity of these sites, combined with developments in the technology that enabled them, and the increasing availability and affordability of high-speed connections made video content far more common on all kinds of websites. This new media-rich model for information exchange, featuring user-generated and user-edited websites, was dubbed Web 2.0, a term coined in 1999 by Darcy DiNucci and popularized in 2004 at the Web 2.0 Conference. The Web 2.0 boom drew investment from companies worldwide and saw many new service-oriented startups catering to a newly "democratized" Web.

JavaScript made the development of interactive web applications possible. Web pages could run JavaScript and respond to user input, but they could not interact with the network. Browsers could submit data to servers via forms and receive new pages, but this was slow compared to traditional desktop applications. Developers that wanted to offer sophisticated applications over the Web used Java or nonstandard solutions such as Adobe Flash or Microsoft's ActiveX.

Microsoft added a little-noticed feature called XMLHttpRequest to Internet Explorer in 1999, which enabled a web page to communicate with the server while remaining visible. Developers at Oddpost used this feature in 2002 to create the first Ajax application, a webmail client that performed as well as a desktop application. Ajax apps were revolutionary. Web pages evolved beyond static documents to full-blown applications. Websites began offering APIs in addition to webpages. Developers created a plethora of Ajax apps including widgets, mashups and new types of social apps. Analysts called it Web 2.0.

Browser vendors improved the performance of their JavaScript engines and dropped support for Flash and Java. Traditional client server applications were replaced by cloud apps. Amazon reinvented itself as a cloud service provider.

The use of social media on the Web has become ubiquitous in everyday life. The 2010s also saw the rise of streaming services, such as Netflix.

In spite of the success of Web 2.0 applications, the W3C forged ahead with their plan to replace HTML with XHTML and represent all data in XML. In 2004, representatives from Mozilla, Opera, and Apple formed an opposing group, the Web Hypertext Application Technology Working Group (WHATWG), dedicated to improving HTML while maintaining backward compatibility. For the next several years, websites did not transition their content to XHTML; browser vendors did not adopt XHTML2; and developers eschewed XML in favor of JSON. By 2007, the W3C conceded and announced they were restarting work on HTML and in 2009, they officially abandoned XHTML. In 2019, the W3C ceded control of the HTML specification, now called the HTML Living Standard, to WHATWG.

Microsoft rewrote their Edge browser in 2021 to use Chromium as its code base in order to be more compatible with Chrome.

=== Security, censorship and cybercrime ===
The increasing use of encrypted connections (HTTPS) enabled e-commerce and online banking. Nonetheless, the 2010s saw the emergence of various controversial trends, such as internet censorship and the growth of cybercrime, including web-based cyberattacks and ransomware.

=== Mobile ===
Early attempts to allow wireless devices to access the Web used simplified formats such as i-mode and WAP. Apple introduced the first smartphone in 2007 with a full-featured browser. Other companies followed suit and in 2011, smartphone sales overtook PCs. Since 2016, most visitors access websites with mobile devices which led to the adoption of responsive web design.

Apple, Mozilla, and Google have taken different approaches to integrating smartphones with modern web apps. Apple initially promoted web apps for the iPhone, but then encouraged developers to make native apps. Mozilla announced Web APIs in 2011 to allow webapps to access hardware features such as audio, camera or GPS. Frameworks such as Cordova and Ionic allow developers to build hybrid apps. Mozilla released a mobile OS designed to run web apps in 2012, but discontinued it in 2015.

Google announced specifications for Accelerated Mobile Pages (AMP), and progressive web applications (PWA) in 2015. AMPs use a combination of HTML, JavaScript, and Web Components to optimize web pages for mobile devices; and PWAs are web pages that, with a combination of web workers and manifest files, can be saved to a mobile device and opened like a native app.

=== Web 3.0 and Web3 ===
The extension of the Web to facilitate data exchange was explored as an approach to create a Semantic Web (sometimes called Web 3.0). This involved using machine-readable information and interoperability standards to enable context-understanding programs to intelligently select information for users. Continued extension of the Web has focused on connecting devices to the Internet, coined Intelligent Device Management. As Internet connectivity becomes ubiquitous, manufacturers have started to leverage the expanded computing power of their devices to enhance their usability and capability. Through Internet connectivity, manufacturers are now able to interact with the devices they have sold and shipped to their customers, and customers are able to interact with the manufacturer (and other providers) to access a lot of new content.

This phenomenon has led to the rise of the Internet of Things (IoT), where modern devices are connected through sensors, software, and other technologies that exchange information with other devices and systems on the Internet. This creates an environment where data can be collected and analyzed instantly, providing better insights and improving the decision-making process. Additionally, the integration of AI with IoT devices continues to improve their capabilities, allowing them to predict customer needs and perform tasks, increasing efficiency and user satisfaction.

Web3 (sometimes also referred to as Web 3.0) is an idea for a decentralized Web based on public blockchains, smart contracts, digital tokens and digital wallets.

=== Beyond Web 3.0 ===
The next generation of the Web is often termed Web 4.0, but its definition is not clear. According to some sources, it is a Web that involves artificial intelligence, the internet of things, pervasive computing, ubiquitous computing and the Web of Things among other concepts. According to the European Union, Web 4.0 is "the expected fourth generation of the World Wide Web. Using advanced artificial and ambient intelligence, the internet of things, trusted blockchain transactions, virtual worlds and XR capabilities, digital and real objects and environments are fully integrated and communicate with each other, enabling truly intuitive, immersive experiences, seamlessly blending the physical and digital worlds".

== Historiography ==
Historiography of the Web poses specific challenges, including disposable data, missing links, lost content and archived websites, which have consequences for web historians. Sites such as the Internet Archive aim to preserve content.

== See also ==
- Fediverse
- History of email
- History of hypertext
- History of the Internet
- History of telecommunication
- History of web syndication technology
- List of websites founded before 1995
- Webring

=== Online services before the World Wide Web ===
- Minitel
- NABU Network
- Quantum Link / AOL
- CompuServe
- GEnie
- Usenet
- Bulletin board system
- Prestel
- Scrapbook
- Category:Pre–World Wide Web online services
