= LWP =

LWP may refer to:

== Computing ==
- LAN WorkPlace, a former TCP/IP-based network client product by Excelan and Novell
- Library for WWW in Perl, a networking library
- Light-weight process
- Live Wallpaper, on mobile devices
- Lotus Word Pro, a word processor

== Other uses ==
- Life without parole, a prison sentence
- Polish People's Army (Polish: Ludowe Wojsko Polskie), during the People's Republic of Poland (1943–1989)
