= Libwww =

Software library

libwww
- Other names: [CERN] Common [WWW] Library, CERN World-Wide Web Library of Common Code, W3C Reference Library, W3C Sample Code Library, W3C Protocol Library
- Original author(s): Tim Berners-Lee, Jean-François Groff, Henrik Frystyk Nielsen
- Developer(s): José Kahan
- Initial release: 1.0, November 1992; 32 years ago
- Stable release: 5.4.2 / 24 June 2017; 8 years ago
- Repository: github.com/w3c/libwww
- Written in: C
- Operating system: FreeBSD, Solaris, Linux, Mac OS X, Microsoft Windows
- Type: Library for web browsers, servers, and other protocols
- License: W3C Software Notice and License
- Website: www.w3.org/Library

Libwww is an early World Wide Web software library providing core functions for web browsers, implementing HTML, HTTP, and other technologies. Tim Berners-Lee, at the European Organization for Nuclear Research (CERN), released libwww (then also called the Common Library) in late 1992, comprising reusable code from the first browsers (WorldWideWeb and Line Mode Browser).

Libwww was relied upon by the then popular browser Mosaic. By 1997, interest in libwww declined, and the World Wide Web Consortium (W3C), which took over from CERN, reduced its commitment to the project. Later, the purpose of libwww was redefined to be "a testbed for protocol experiments"; in that role it was maintained for the benefit of the W3C's web standards-promoting browser Amaya. Active development of libwww stopped in 2000.

== History ==
In 1991 and 1992, Tim Berners-Lee and a student at CERN named Jean-François Groff rewrote various components of the original WorldWideWeb browser for the NeXTstep operating system in portable C code, in order to demonstrate the potential of the World Wide Web. In the beginning, libwww was referred to as the Common Library and was not available as a separate product. Before becoming generally available, libwww was integrated in the CERN program library (CERNLIB). In July 1992 the library was ported to DECnet. In the May 1993 World Wide Web Newsletter Berners-Lee announced that the Common Library was now called libwww and was licensed as public domain to encourage the development of web browsers. He initially considered releasing the software under the GNU General Public License, rather than into the public domain, but decided against it due to concerns that large corporations such as IBM would be deterred from using it by the restrictions of the GPL. The rapid early development of the library caused Robert Cailliau problems when integrating it into his MacWWW browser.

From February 1994 to July 1999 (versions 2.17 to 5.2.8), Henrik Frystyk Nielsen was responsible for libwww, first as a graduate student at CERN and later at the World Wide Web Consortium (W3C). On 21 March 1995, with the release of version 3.0, CERN transferred responsibility for libwww to the W3C. From 1995 onwards, the Line Mode Browser was no longer released separately, but part of the libwww package.

On 2 March 1997, Nielsen announced that Libwww 5.1 was expected to be the last release. Later that year, on 24 Dec 1997, Nielsen put out an unsuccessful call for another party outside W3C to take over maintenance of the library.

Nielsen left the W3C in July 1999, and the project was thereafter headed by José Kahan as the only W3C employee involved with the project.

On 2 September 2003 the W3C (re-)stated that development had stopped, citing a lack of resources. On 29 January 2004, the W3C once again confirmed that it would not continue development, and was seeking open source community maintainers.

The first (and only) "community supported maintenance release" was made in 2005, after a gap of 3 years. After a further lapse of 12 years, a security patch was released in 2017.

== Features ==
In 2003, Kahan claimed that "libwww is the only library that has a full implementation of the HTTP specification, including caching and pipelining."

Libwww supports following protocols:

- file
- FTP
- Gopher
- HTTP 1.1 with a Persistent Cache Manager, pipelining
- NNTP
- Telnet
- WAIS

Other features include:

- TLS and SSL can be used through OpenSSL.
- gzip compression and decompression through zlib
- a HTML, RDF, SGML and XML parser and a style sheet manager
- an integration of a SQL database (using the MySQL server) for e.g. web crawlers

Libwww supports plug-ins.

== Applications using libwww ==
It has been used for applications of varying sizes, including web browsers, editors, Internet bots, and batch tools. Pluggable modules provided with libwww add support for HTTP/1.1 with caching, pipelining, POST, Digest Authentication, and deflate.

The W3C created the Arena web browser as a testbed and testing tool for HTML3, Cascading Style Sheets (CSS), Portable Network Graphics (PNG) and libwww, among other technologies. Arena was later replaced in that role by Amaya.

According to a survey conducted in September 2003, at least 19 applications used libwww.

- Agora
- Arena
- Amaya
- Cello
- CERN httpd server
- Cygwin
- Distributed Oceanographic Data Systems with the OPeNDAP
- GRIF Symposia, a HTML editor
- Lynx
- MacWWW
- Mosaic
- Robot Operating System (ROS)
- TkWeb
- tkWWW
- WorldWideWeb (later Nexus)

Integrated applications in libwww are:

- Command Line Tool, an application which shows how to use libwww to build simple batch mode tools to access the Web.
- Line Mode Browser, a Spartan web browser.
- Webbot, a simple application showing how to use libwww to build robots.
- Mini Server, a small application showing how to implement a server or a proxy using libwww.

== Criticism ==
The developers of libcurl have criticised libwww as being not as portable, not thread-safe and lacking several HTTP authentication types. Neither libcurl nor libwww are lightweight enough for some projects.

== See also ==
- Library for WWW in Perl
- cURL
