= Nicola Pellow =

British information scientist who worked on the early World Wide Web

- Education: Leicester Polytechnic
- Known for: Line Mode Browser; MacWWW
- Scientific career
- Fields: Information technology
- Workplaces: CERN

Nicola Pellow is an English mathematician and information scientist who was one of the nineteen members of the WWW Project at CERN working with Tim Berners-Lee. She joined the project in November 1990, while an undergraduate maths student enrolled on a sandwich course at Leicester Polytechnic (now De Montfort University). Pellow recalled having little experience with programming languages, "apart from using a bit of Pascal and FORTRAN as part of my degree course."

Almost immediately after Berners-Lee completed the WorldWideWeb web browser for the NeXT platform Pellow was tasked with creating a browser using her recently acquired skills in the C programming language. The outcome was that she wrote the first generic Line Mode Browser that could run on non-NeXT systems. The WWW team began to improve on her work, creating several experimental versions. Pellow was involved in porting the browser to different types of computers.

She left CERN at the end of August 1991 but returned after graduating in 1992 to work with Robert Cailliau on MacWWW, the first web browser for the classic Mac OS.

== See also ==
- History of the World Wide Web
- Internet pioneers
- Karen Banks – British computer networking pioneer
- Libwww
- Sylvia Wilbur – British computer scientist who worked on the early ARPANET
