= Amaya (web editor) =

Web browser and web editor

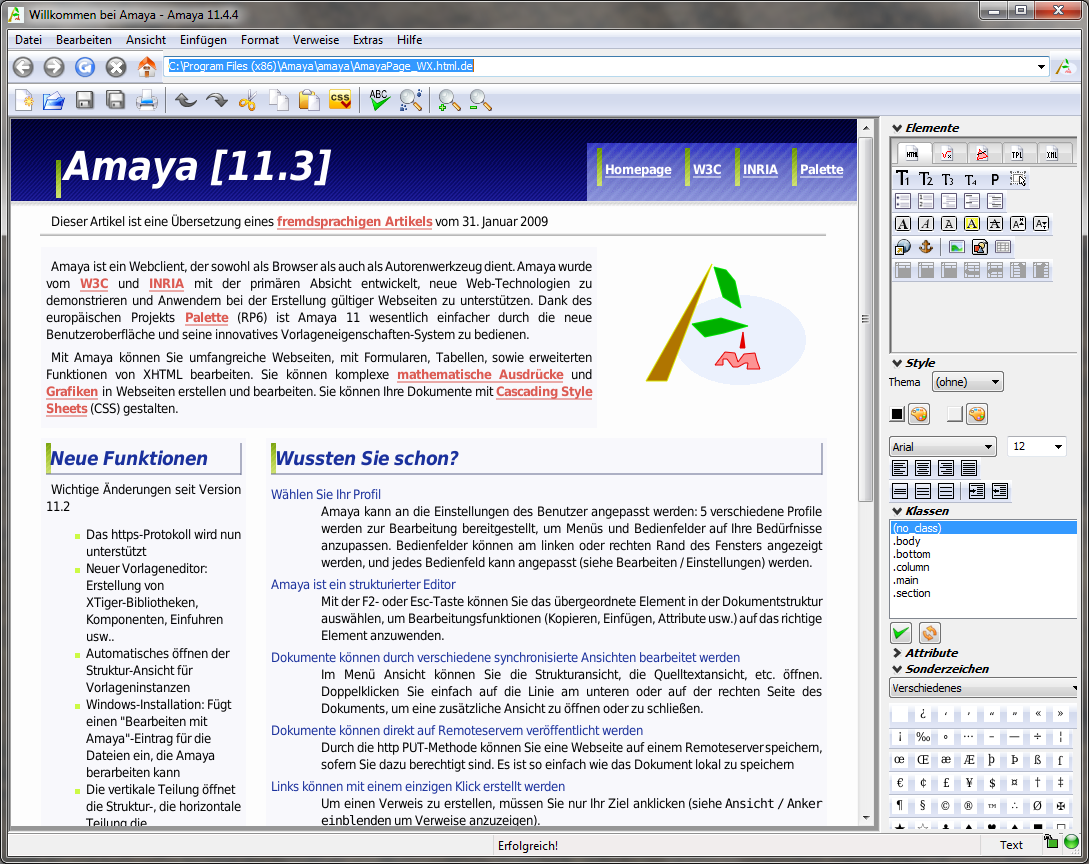
- Amaya 11.3 under Windows 7
- Developers: W3C, INRIA
- Release: July 1996; 30 years ago
- Final release: 11.4.4 / 18 January 2012; 14 years ago
- Preview release: 11.4.7 / 18 April 2013; 13 years ago
- Written in: C
- Operating system: Windows, OS X, Linux
- Platform: IA-32, x86-64
- Available in: English, French, German, Spanish, Italian, Hungarian, Georgian, Norwegian, Portuguese, Russian, Japanese, Chinese, Finnish, Dutch, Slovak, Ukrainian
- Type: HTML editor, web browser
- License: W3C
- Website: www.w3.org/Amaya/
- Repository: github.com/w3c/Amaya-Editor

Amaya (formerly Amaya World) is a discontinued free and open source WYSIWYG web authoring tool with browsing abilities.

It was created by a structured editor project at the INRIA, a French national research institution, and later adopted by the World Wide Web Consortium (W3C) as their testbed for web standards; a role it took over from the Arena web browser. Since the last release in January 2012, INRIA and the W3C have stopped supporting the project and active development has ceased.

Amaya has relatively low system requirements, even in comparison with other web browsers from the era of its active development period, so it has been considered a "lightweight" browser.

== History ==
Amaya originated as a direct descendant of the Grif WYSIWYG SGML editor created in the early 1980s, and of the HTML editor Symposia, itself based on Grif, both developed and sold by French software company Grif SA.

The last change of code of Amaya was on 22 Feb 2013.

== Features ==
- Access keys
- Caret navigation
- Page zooming
- Password management
- Spell checking
- Transport protocols
- Support for CSS, MathML, SVG, RDF and Xpointer
- Displays free and open image formats such as PNG and SVG, as well as a subset of SVG animation

== A test bed application ==
It was used as a test-bed for new web technologies that were not supported in major browsers.

Amaya was the first client that supported the RDF annotation schema using XPointer. The browser was available for Linux, Windows (NT and 95), Mac OS X, AmigaOS, SPARC / Solaris, AIX, OSF/1.

== Naming and logo ==
The old icon

Amaya was formerly called Tamaya. Tamaya is the name of the type of tree represented in the logo, but it was later discovered that Tamaya is also a trademark used by a French company, so the developers chose to drop the first letter to make it "Amaya".

== See also ==
- Arena (web browser)
- Libwww
- Web design program
