= WorldWideWeb =

First web browser, later renamed Nexus

- Developer: Tim Berners-Lee for CERN
- Release: 25 December 1990; 35 years ago
- Final release: 0.17 / 1994; 32 years ago
- Written in: Objective-C
- Operating system: NeXTSTEP
- Available in: English
- Type: Web browser, Web authoring tool
- License: Public-domain software
- Website: w3.org/People/Berners-Lee/WorldWideWeb.html
- Repository: www.w3.org/History/1991-WWW-NeXT/Implementation/

WorldWideWeb (later renamed Nexus to avoid confusion between the software and the World Wide Web) is the first web browser and web page editor. It was discontinued in 1994. It was the first WYSIWYG HTML editor.

The source code was released into the public domain on 30 April 1993.

== History ==
Tim Berners-Lee wrote what would become known as WorldWideWeb on a NeXT Computer during the second half of 1990, while working for CERN, a European nuclear research agency. The first edition was completed "some time before" 25 December 1990, according to Berners-Lee, after two months of development. The browser was announced on the newsgroups and became available to the general public in August 1991. By this time, several others, including Bernd Pollermann, Robert Cailliau, Jean-François Groff, and visiting undergraduate student Nicola Pellow – who later wrote the Line Mode Browser – were involved in the project.

Berners-Lee considered different names for his new application, including The Mine of Information and The Information Mesh, before publicly launching the WorldWideWeb browser in 1991. When a new version was released in 1994, it was renamed Nexus Browser, in order to differentiate between the software (WorldWideWeb) and the World Wide Web.

The team created so called "passive browsers" which do not have the ability to edit because it was hard to port this feature from the NeXT system to other operating systems. Porting to the X Window System was not possible as nobody on the team had experience with the X Window System.

Berners-Lee and Groff later adapted many of WorldWideWeb's components into a C programming language version, creating the libwww API.

On 30 April 1993, the CERN directorate released the source code of WorldWideWeb into the public domain. Several versions of the software are still available on the web in various states. Berners-Lee initially considered releasing it under the GNU General Public License, but after hearing rumors that companies might balk at the concept if any licensing issues were involved, he eventually opted to release it into the public domain. In 2021, Sotheby's held an auction for an NFT of the WorldWideWeb source code.

== Features ==
Since WorldWideWeb was developed on and for the NeXTSTEP platform, the program uses many of NeXTSTEP's components – WorldWideWeb's layout engine was built around NeXTSTEP's Text class.

WorldWideWeb is capable of displaying basic style sheets, downloading and opening any file type with a MIME type that is also supported by the NeXT system (PostScript, movies, and sounds), browsing newsgroups, and spellchecking. In earlier versions, images are displayed in separate windows, until NeXTSTEP's Text class gained support for Image objects. WorldWideWeb is able to use different protocols: FTP, HTTP, NNTP, and local files. Later versions are able to display inline images.

The browser is also a WYSIWYG editor. It allows the simultaneous editing and linking of many pages in different windows. The functions "Mark Selection", which creates an anchor, and "Link to Marked", which makes the selected text an anchor linking to the last marked anchor, allow the creation of links. Editing pages remotely is not possible, as the HTTP PUT method had not yet been implemented during the period of the application's active development.

WorldWideWeb's navigation panel contains Next and Previous buttons that automatically navigate to the next or previous link on the last page visited, similar to Opera's Rewind and Fast Forward buttons, or HyperCard; i.e., if one navigated to a page from a table of links, the Previous button would cause the browser to load the previous page linked in the table.

WorldWideWeb does not have bookmarks as they exist in later browsers, but a similar feature was provided: to save a link for later use, users could link to it from their own home page (start page). Users could create multiple home pages, similar to folders in modern web browsers' bookmarks.

== See also ==
- History of the World Wide Web
- Wiki
