= MacWWW =

1992 web browser

- Screenshot of MacWWW
- Developers: Robert Cailliau, Nicola Pellow
- Release: December 1992; 33 years ago
- Final release: 1.03
- Written in: THINK C
- Operating system: Classic Mac OS System 6.0.5, System 7
- Available in: English
- Type: Web browser

MacWWW, also known as Samba, is an early minimalist web browser from 1992 meant to run on Macintosh computers. It was the first web browser for the classic Mac OS platform, the first for any non-Unix operating system, and the only browser ever released that supported System 6. MacWWW tried to emulate the design of WorldWideWeb. Unlike modern browsers it opened each link in a new window only after a double-click. It was a commercial product from CERN and cost 50 European Currency Units.

The browser is no longer available from its original ftp location, but can still be downloaded from mirrors. (Note: The original ftp location at ftp://info.cern.ch/pub/www/bin/mac/ is no longer available.)

== History ==
It was written at CERN by Robert Cailliau and later Nicola Pellow helped with the development. Pellow worked originally on the Line Mode Browser and both browsers shared some parts of the source code after her switching. Pre-alpha version were available, but this version worked only on "coliur [sic] mac but not on big black and white ones it seems."

Version 1.00 was released on 12 May 1993 with the commentary: "We know there is much to be improved, but it works well on system 7 and system 6.0.5".

== Features ==
Clearly, this is a browser of limited usefulness, and one that was overtaken so quickly by every other graphical browser that loading it today is almost like stepping back into the dark ages. Interesting, but only as a curiosity.

As a minimalist browser, MacWWW displayed only text, no images nor lists.

- Implemented in THINK C using its human interface objects.
- Uses much code in common with the Line Mode browser. This code later became libwww.
- bookmarks
- For the hypertext object, the THINK C text object was modified to allow multifont capability, and to allow anchors to be encoded in the styles.

According to critics, within a year the browser became obsolete because Mosaic and MacWeb had much more features, for example MacWWW showed no loading status. Without the mouse and MacOS support MacWWW would be a text-mode browser.

== See also ==
- List of old Macintosh software
