= Line Mode Browser =

Command-line web browser

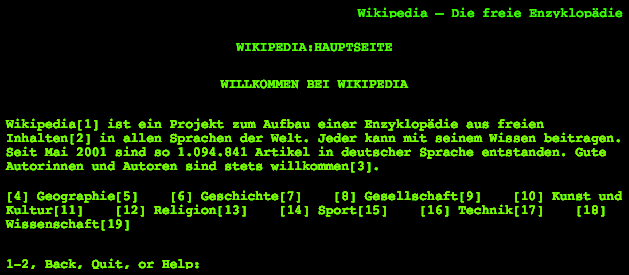
- Line Mode Browser displaying the German Wikipedia
- Original authors: Tim Berners-Lee; Henrik Frystyk Nielsen; Nicola Pellow
- Developer: W3C / CERN
- Initial release: 0.7, 14 May 1991
- Stable release: 5.4.2 / 24 June 2017; 8 years ago
- Written in: C
- Operating system: Cross-platform, same as Libwww
- Type: Web browser
- License: W3C Software Notice and License
- Website: www.w3.org/LineMode/

The Line Mode Browser (also known as LMB, WWWLib, or just www) is the second web browser ever created. The browser was the first demonstrated to be portable to several different operating systems. Operated from a simple command-line interface, it could be widely used on many computers and computer terminals throughout the Internet. The browser was developed starting in 1990, and then supported by the World Wide Web Consortium (W3C) as an example and test application for the libwww library.

== History ==
One of the fundamental concepts of the "World Wide Web" projects at CERN was "universal readership". In 1990, Tim Berners-Lee had already written the first browser, WorldWideWeb (later renamed to Nexus), but that program only worked on the proprietary software of NeXT computers, which were in limited use. Berners-Lee and his team could not port the WorldWideWeb application with its features—including the graphical WYSIWYG editor— to the more widely deployed X Window System, since they had no experience in programming it. The team recruited Nicola Pellow, a math student intern working at CERN, to write a "passive browser" so basic that it could run on most computers of that time. The name "Line Mode Browser" refers to the fact that, to ensure compatibility with the earliest computer terminals such as Teletype machines, the program only displayed text, (no images) and had only line-by-line text input (no cursor positioning).

Development started in November 1990 and the browser was demonstrated in December 1990. The development environment used resources from the PRIAM project, a French language acronym for "PRojet Interdivisionnaire d'Assistance aux Microprocesseurs", a project to standardise microprocessor development across CERN. The short development time produced software in a simplified dialect of the C programming language. The official standard ANSI C was not yet available on all platforms. The Line Mode Browser was released to a limited audience on VAX, RS/6000 and Sun-4 computers in March 1991, marking the first functional networked deployment of the World Wide Web on CERN's central computers. Before the release of the first publicly available version, it was integrated into the CERN Program Library (CERNLIB), used mostly by the High-Energy Physics-community. The first beta of the browser was released on 8 April 1991. Berners-Lee announced the browser's availability in August 1991 in the alt.hypertext newsgroup of Usenet. Users could use the browser from anywhere in the Internet through the telnet protocol to the info.cern.ch machine (which was also the first web server). The spreading news of the World Wide Web in 1991 increased interest in the project at CERN and other laboratories such as DESY in Germany, and elsewhere throughout the world.

The first stable version, 1.1, was released in January 1992. Since version 1.2l, released in October 1992, the browser has used the common code library (later called libwww). The main developer, Pellow, started working on the MacWWW project, and both browsers began to share some source code. In the May 1993 World Wide Web Newsletter Berners-Lee announced that the browser was released into the public domain to reduce the work on new clients. On 21 March 1995, with the release of version 3.0, CERN put the full responsibility for maintaining the Line Mode Browser on the W3C. The Line Mode Browser and the libwww library are closely tied together—the last independent release of a separate browser component was in 1995, and the browser became part of libwww.

The Agora World Wide Web email browser was based on the Line Mode Browser. The Line Mode Browser was very popular in the beginning of the web, since it was the only web browser available for all operating systems. Statistics from January 1994 show that Mosaic had quickly changed the web browser landscape and only 2% of all World Wide Web users browsed by Line Mode Browser. The new niche of text-only web browser was filled by Lynx, which made the Line Mode Browser largely irrelevant as a browser. One reason was that Lynx is much more flexible than the Line Mode Browser. It then became a test application for the libwww.

== Operating mode ==
The simplicity of the Line Mode Browser had several limitations. The Line Mode Browser was designed to work on any operating system using what were called "dumb" terminals. The user interface had to be as simple as possible. The user began with a command-line interface specifying a Uniform Resource Locator (URL). The requested web page was then printed line by line on the screen, like a teleprinter. Websites were displayed using the first versions of HTML. Formatting was achieved with capitalization, indentation, and new lines. Header elements were capitalized, centered and separated from the normal text by empty lines.

Navigation was not controlled by a pointing device such as a mouse or arrow keys, but by text commands typed into the program. Numbers in brackets are displayed for each link; links are opened by typing the corresponding number into the program. This led one journalist of the time to write: "The Web is a way of finding information by typing numbers." The page scrolled down when an empty command (carriage return) was entered, and scrolled up with the command "u". The command "b" navigated backwards in history, and new pages were navigated with "g http://..." (for go to) and the URL.

The browser had no authoring functions, so pages could only be read and not edited. This was considered to be unfortunate by Robert Cailliau, one of the developers:

"I think in retrospect the biggest mistake made in the whole project was the public release of the Line-Mode Browser. It gave the Internet hackers immediate access, but only from the point of view of the passive browser—no editing capabilities"

== Features ==
The Line Mode Browser was designed to be able to be platform independent. There are official ports to Apollo/Domain, IBM RS6000, DECStation/ultrix, VAX/VMS, VAX/Ultrix, MS-DOS, Unix, Windows, Classic Mac OS, Linux, MVS, VM/CMS, FreeBSD, Solaris, and to macOS. The browser supports many protocols like File Transfer Protocol (FTP), Gopher, Hypertext Transfer Protocol (HTTP), Network News Transfer Protocol (NNTP), and Wide area information server (WAIS).

Other features included rlogin and telnet hyperlinks, Cyrillic support (added on 25 November 1994 in version 2.15), and ability to be set up as a proxy client. The browser could run as a background process and download files. The Line Mode Browser has had problems recognizing character entities, properly collapsing whitespace, and supporting tables and frames.

== See also ==
- History of the World Wide Web
