= Autism Brain Imaging Data Exchange =

Neuroimaging database

The Autism Brain Imaging Data Exchange (ABIDE) is an international consortium of open access neuroimaging data on autism. Established in 2012 with funding from the National Institute of Mental Health , its initial archive comprised 1,112 existing (R-fMRI) data sets on individuals (autistic and scientific control). On average since the project's inception one peer-reviewed paper has been published which cited the exchange's data in ABID-I.

In July 2016 its second release, dubbed "ABIDE-II", doubled the database to 2,200 such individuals. More recently (October 2025) some of the exchange's data has served as a test bed for AI analysis with a view to improving that technology's contribution to clinical practice. In the aggregate 24 international laboratories have contributed to ABIDE.

== See also ==
- Official website
