= Yggdrasil Linux/GNU/X =

Linux distribution

Linux/GNU/X Plug-and-Play Linux
- OS family: Linux (Unix-like)
- Working state: Obsolete
- Source model: Open source
- Initial release: December 8, 1992; 33 years ago
- Supported platforms: IA-32
- Kernel type: Linux kernel
- Userland: GNU
- Default user interface: FVWM
- License: GNU GPL

Yggdrasil Linux/GNU/X, or LGX (pronounced igg-drah-sill), is an early Linux distribution developed by Yggdrasil Computing, Incorporated, a company founded by Adam J. Richter in Berkeley, California.

Yggdrasil was the first company to create a live CD Linux distribution. Yggdrasil Linux described itself as an "Plug-and-Play" Linux distribution, automatically configuring itself for the hardware.

Yggdrasil is the World Tree of Norse mythology. The name was chosen because Yggdrasil took disparate pieces of software and assembled them into a complete product. Yggdrasil's company motto was "Free Software For The Rest of Us".

Yggdrasil is compliant with the Unix Filesystem Hierarchy Standard.

== History and releases ==
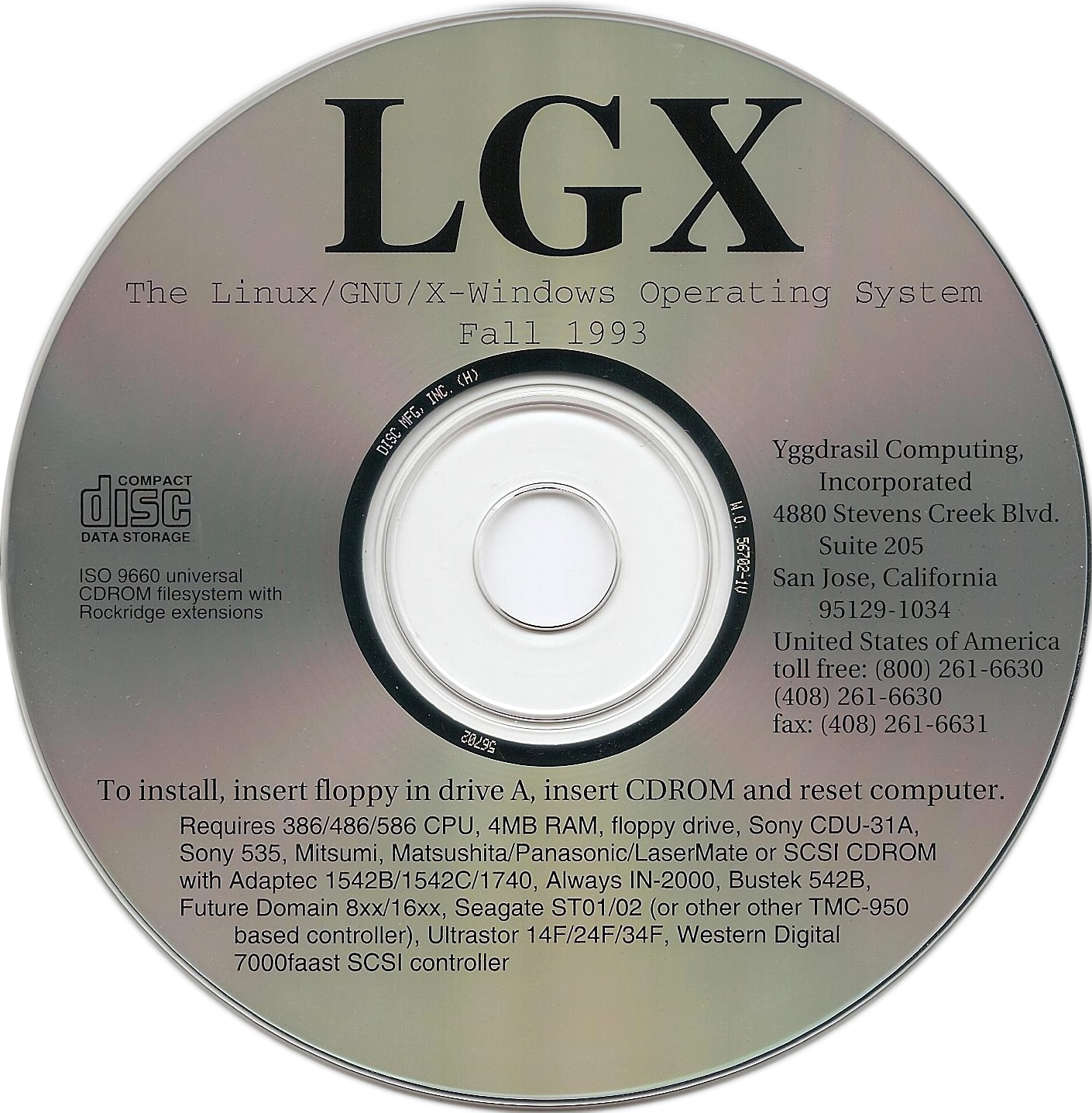
CD-ROM of the LGX Yggdrasil Linux distribution release "Fall 1993"

Yggdrasil announced their ‘bootable Linux/GNU/X-based UNIX(R) clone for PC compatibles’ on 25 November 1992 and made the first release on 8 December 1992. This alpha release contained the 0.98.1 version of the Linux kernel, the v11r5 version of the X Window System supporting up to 1024x768 with 256 colours, various GNU utilities such as their C/C++ compiler, the GNU Debugger, bison, flex, and make, TeX, groff, Ghostscript, the elvis and Emacs editors, and various other software. Yggdrasil's alpha release required a 386 computer with 8 MB RAM and 100 MB hard disk. The alpha release was missing some of the source code of some of the packages, such as elvis.

A beta release was made on 18 February 1993. The beta's cost was US$60. LGX's beta release in 1993 contained the 0.99.5 version of the Linux kernel, along with other software from GNU and X. By 22 August 1993, the Yggdrasil company had sold over 3100 copies of the LGX beta distribution.

The production release version carried a pricetag of US$99. However, Yggdrasil was offered for free to any developer whose software was included with the CD distribution. According to an email from the company's founder the marginal cost of each subscription was $35.70.

Early Yggdrasil releases were also available from stores selling CD-ROM software.

== Yggdrasil Computing, Incorporated ==
Adam J. Richter started the Yggdrasil company together with Bill Selmeier. Richter spoke to Michael Tiemann about setting up a business, but was not interested in joining forces with Cygnus.

Richter was a member of League for Programming Freedom. Richter was using only a 200 MB hard disk when building the alpha release of LGX, which prevented him from practically being able to include the source code of some of the packages contained in the CDROM.

Yggdrasil Incorporated published some of the early Linux compilation books, such as The Linux Bible: The GNU Testament (ISBN 978-1883601201), and contributed significantly to file system and X Window System functionality of Linux in the early days of their operation.

The company moved to San Jose, California in 1996. In 1996, Yggdrasil Incorporated released the Winter 1996 edition of Linux Internet Archives. Six CDs of Linux software from Tsx-11 and Sunsite, the GNU archive on prep.ai.mit.edu, the X11R6 archives including the free contributed X11R6 software from ftp.x.org, the Internet RFC standards, and a total of nine non-Yggdrasil Linux distributions.

The company remained active until at least year 2000, when it released the Linux Open Source DVD, but its website was taken offline afterwards and the company has not released anything since.

The company's last corporate filing was in January 2004. The California Secretary of State lists it as suspended.

The company once made an offer to donate 60% of the Yggdrasil CDROM sales revenues to the Computer Systems Research Group, but founder Adam J. Richter later indicated that the company would lose too much money and changed the offer accordingly, while still maintaining donations to CSRG.

The company also had volume discount plans.

== See also ==
- Arena, a web browser once developed by Yggdrasil Computing
- MCC Interim Linux
