= CERN httpd =

Early web server

- Original authors: Tim Berners-Lee, Ari Luotonen, Henrik Frystyk Nielsen
- Developer: CERN / World Wide Web Consortium
- Release: 24 December 1990; 35 years ago
- Final release: 3.0A / 15 July 1996; 29 years ago
- Operating system: Unix, Unix-like
- Available in: C
- Type: Web server, proxy server
- License: MIT Copyright Statement with acknowledgement to CERN
- Website: www.w3.org/Daemon/

CERN httpd (later also known as W3C httpd) is an early, now discontinued, web server (HTTP) daemon originally developed at CERN from 1990 onwards by Tim Berners-Lee, Ari Luotonen and Henrik Frystyk Nielsen. Implemented in C, it was the first web server software.

== History ==
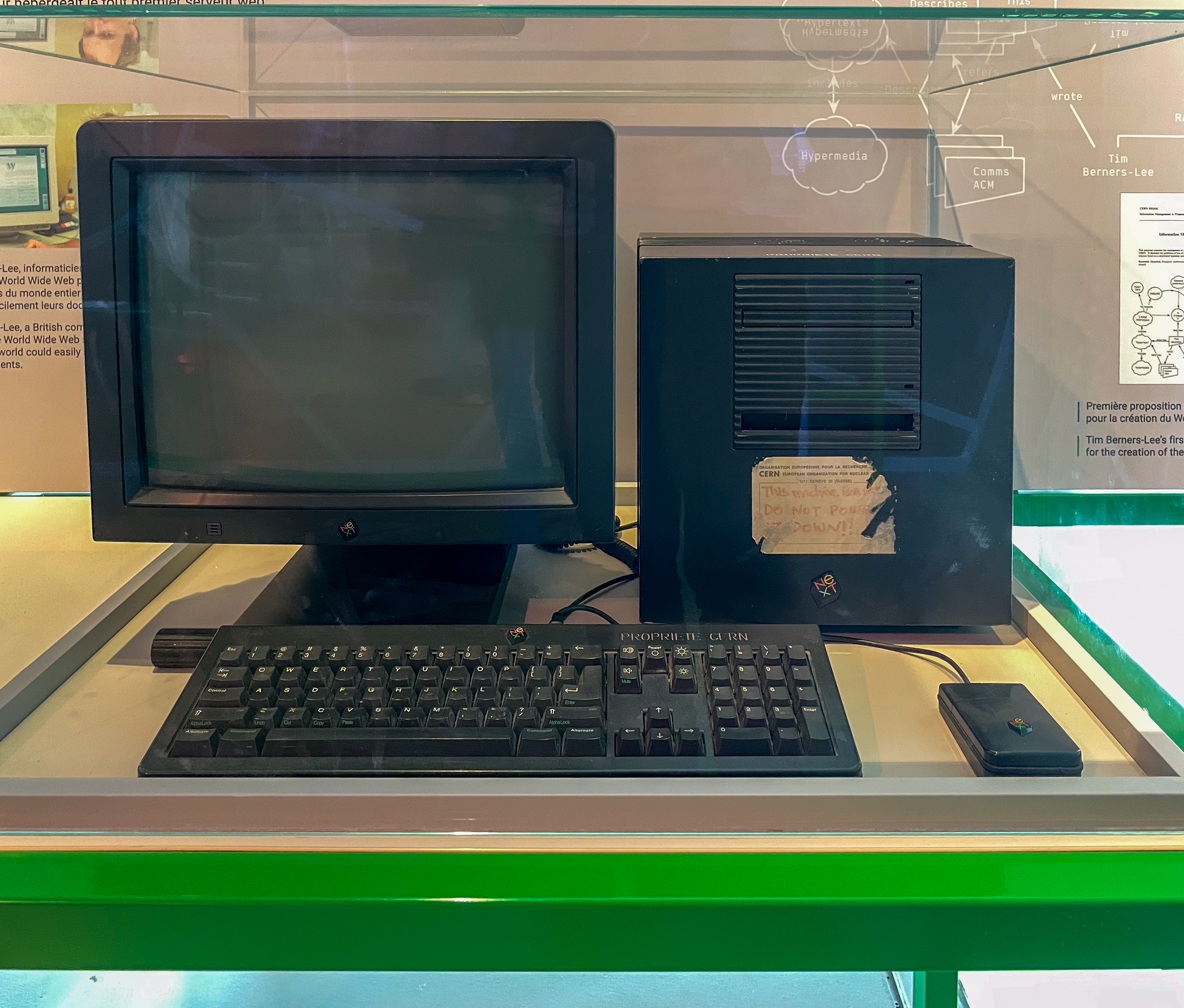
This NeXT Computer used by Tim Berners-Lee at CERN became the world's first web server

CERN httpd was originally developed on a NeXT Computer running NeXTSTEP, and was later ported to other Unix-like operating systems, OpenVMS and systems with unix emulation layers, e.g. OS/2 with emx+gcc. It could also be configured as a web proxy server. Version 0.1 was released in June 1991. In August 1991, Berners-Lee announced in the Usenet newsgroup alt.hypertext the availability of the source code of the server daemon (named WWWDaemon) and other World Wide Web software from the CERN FTP site.

The original, first generation HTTP server which some call the Volkswagen of the Web.

The server was presented on the Hypertext 91 conference in San Antonio and was part of the CERN Program Library (CERNLIB).

Later versions of the server are based on the libwww library. The development of CERN httpd was later taken over by World Wide Web Consortium (W3C), with the last release being version 3.0A of 15 July 1996. From 1996 onwards, W3C focused on the development of the Java-based Jigsaw server.

The initial version was public domain software; the last one was under an MIT License.

== Java rewrite ==
Jigsaw
- Original author: Yves Lafon
- Developer: Jigsaw Team
- Final release: 2.2.6 / 10 April 2007; 19 years ago
- Written in: Java
- Platform: Java
- Predecessor: CERN httpd
- Standard: HTTP/1.1
- Type: Web server
- Website: www.w3.org/Jigsaw/

Jigsaw is a web server software written in Java. It is the successor to CERN httpd, the first web server software ever, and was developed by the World Wide Web Consortium.

Jigsaw supports HTTP/1.1 and is a reference implementation for the W3C and an experimental platform for the Internet community. The server is configurable via HTML forms, and new Java classes can be added during operation.

The first released version was 1.0alpha1 and appeared in June 1996. Version 2.0.0 was completed on December 24, 1998. The last released version is 2.2.6 from April 10, 2007.

== See also ==
- CERN
- Web server
- Comparison of web server software
- Apache Traffic Server
- Web accelerator, which discusses host-based HTTP acceleration
- Proxy server, which discusses client-side proxies
- Reverse proxy, which discusses origin-side proxies
