= Dave Raggett =

English computer specialist

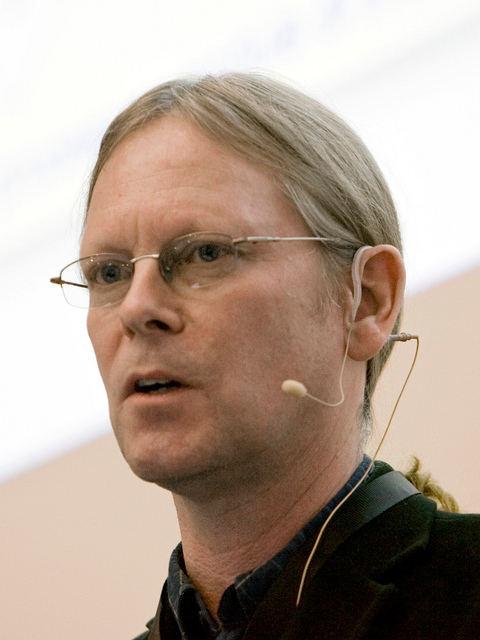
- 2008 photo
- Born: 8 June 1955 (age 71)
- Occupation: Computer scientist
- Known for: developing HTML2, HTML3, HTML4
- Website: http://www.w3.org/People/Raggett/

Dave Raggett is an English computer specialist who has played a major role in implementing the World Wide Web since 1992. He has been a W3C Fellow at the World Wide Web Consortium since 1995 and worked on many of the key web protocols, including HTTP, HTML, XHTML, MathML, XForms, and VoiceXML. Raggett also wrote HTML Tidy and is currently pioneering W3C's work on the Web of Things. He lives in the west of England.

== Career ==
From 1981 to 1984, Dave Raggett worked at Research Machines, designing and developing software for local networking of Z80 machines for use in schools. The following year, as a software developer in Hewlett-Packard's Office Productivity Division, he worked on remote printing solutions.

From 1985 to 2000, Raggett worked as a researcher at Hewlett-Packard Labs in Bristol, England, where he pursued a variety of projects, including expert systems, hypertext, networking, Web browsers, and servers, embedded systems, interactive voice response systems.

After he met Tim Berners-Lee in 1992, Raggett was involved in the development of the World Wide Web.

In 1993, Raggett devoted his spare time to developing a Web browser called Arena, on which he hoped to demonstrate new and future HTML specifications. Development of the browser was slow because Raggett was the lone developer and Hewlett-Packard, like many other computer corporations at the time, was unconvinced that the World-Wide-Web would succeed, and thus did not consider investing in web browser development.

In Weaving the Web: The Original Design and Ultimate Destiny of the World Wide Web by its inventor, Tim Berners-Lee wrote:

One of the few commercial developers to join the contest was Dave Raggett at Hewlett-Packard in Bristol, England. He created a browser called Arena. HP had a convention that an employee could engage in related, useful, but not official work for 10 percent of his or her job time. Dave spent his 10 percent time, plus a lot of evenings and weekends, on Arena. He was convinced that hypertext Web pages could be much more exciting, like magazine pages rather than textbook pages, and that HTML could be used to position not just text on a page but pictures, tables, and other features. He used Arena to demonstrate all these things, and to experiment with different ways of reading and interpreting both valid and incorrectly written HTML pages.

Raggett demonstrated the browser at the First International Conference on the World-Wide Web in Geneva, Switzerland in 1994 and the 1994 ISOC conference in Prague to show text flow around images, forms, and other aspects of HTML later termed as the HTML+ specification. Raggett subsequently partnered with CERN to develop Arena further as a proof of concept browser for this work. Using the Arena browser, Raggett, Henrik Frystyk Nielsen, Håkon Wium Lie, and others demonstrated text flow around a figure with captions, resizable tables, image backgrounds, HTML math, and other features.

In 1994, Raggett organized a Birds of a Feather (BOF) on HTTP, and went on to launch and chair the IETF HTTP working group, as well as driving early standards work on HTML+, HTML 3.0, HTML tables, and working with NCSA on the design of HTML forms.

Between 1995 and 1997, Raggett worked on an assignment at the Massachusetts Institute of Technology Laboratory for Computer Science in Cambridge, Massachusetts, as part of his role as World Wide Web Consortium (W3C) Fellow.

In 1998, he organized the W3C workshop Shaping the Future of HTML.

From 2000 to 2003, Raggett worked at Openwave Systems as a technical manager for Openwave's involvement in W3C and W3C Fellow (member of W3C staff). Openwave had experience with VoiceXML for unified messaging. They also planned to add mobile support for multimodal services, but had to refocus due to a downturn in telecoms spending by mobile operators.

In the next three years, he worked at Canon as a consultant working on driving the evolution of standards for multimodal interaction and other W3C technologies.

From 2006 to 2007, Raggett worked at Volantis as a principal researcher working on standards and related proof of concept implementations, focusing on standards work on the Ubiquitous Web.

The term Virtual Reality Modeling Language (VRML) was coined by Raggett in a paper submitted to the First International Conference on the World-Wide Web in 1994, and first discussed at the WWW94 VRML BOF established by Tim Berners-Lee, where Mark Pesce presented the Labyrinth demo he developed with Tony Parisi and Peter Kennard.

== Specifications/Protocols ==
Specifications and protocols written and developed by Raggett include:

- XForms
- HTML+/3.0/4.01
- XBRL

== Awards ==
- January 2004: Talking Hands Award

== Publications ==
- "HTML 3", published in 1996 by Addison Wesley
- "Raggett on HTML 4", published in 1998 by Addison Wesley
- "Beginning XHTML", published in 2000 by Wrox press
- "XHTML example by example", published 2002 by Prentice-Hall
