= Jean-François Groff =

Telecommunication engineer and world-wide web pioneer

Jean-François Groff is a telecommunication engineer, and one of the key figures in the early development of the World Wide Web at CERN. He worked in close collaboration with Tim Berners-Lee, and helped define the HTTP protocol and HTML language. Groff is also the CTO and founder of Studio KOH, and CEO of Mobino, a mobile payments company headquartered in Geneva, Switzerland.

== Background ==
Groff was first introduced to computers as a young boy, around 7 or 8 years of age, by his father, a computer engineer for Saint-Gobain. Young Groff began developing his programming skills on the personal computers that were available to him at home, including Amstrad, and later Atari computers. He graduated with a telecommunications degree from Télécom SudParis (formerly known as Télécom INT).

== Works ==
Groff co-authored an article titled The World-Wide Web: The Information Universe with Tim Berners-Lee, Robert Cailliau and Bernd Pollermann, first published in 1992 and again in 2010 in Computer Networks and ISDN Systems: The International Journal of Computer and Telecommunications Networking.
