= Distributed Oceanographic Data Systems =

The Distributed Oceanographic Data Systems, or DODS, is a type of server that allows sharing data with remote users or between DODS servers. It is developed by the National Oceanic and Atmospheric Administration, and is based upon the OPeNDAP data transport architecture.
