= Remote device management =

Remote Device Management refers to systems and platforms that enable the monitoring, configuration, and management of connected devices over a network. It is a type of technology that is used for enterprise software applications that allow equipment manufacturers to monitor and manage remote equipment, systems and products via the Internet. Another term for remote device management is Intelligent device management while strategic service management describes the service.

IDM extends IT service management to on-site devices and can support standard service processes, such as Incident, Problem, Change, Configuration Management as defined by ITIL.

This technology is commonly used by ATM, security and self-service kiosk companies.

== See also ==
- Machine to machine
- Control system
- HVAC control system
- Control engineering
- Lighting control system
- Intelligent building
- Self-service kiosk
- Canon device management software
