= Ari Luotonen =

Finnish software developer and author

Ari Luotonen is a Finnish software developer and author.

He studied for M.Sc. in Tampere University of Technology, but cut his studies short with an Equivalent of B.Sc. in Computer Science. In July 1993, he moved to Geneva to work for CERN. There, he wrote a large proportion of CERN httpd, especially HTTP caching support. In addition, Luotonen contributed to the implementation of numerous CGI applications, the most famous being the WIT - W3 Interactive Talk.

In September 1994, Luotonen began working at the newly established Mosaic Communications, later renamed to Netscape Communications.

== Works ==
- — (1997). Web Proxy Servers. Prentice Hall. ISBN 0-13-680612-0.
