= Testbed =

Platform for conducting testing

A testbed (also spelled test bed) is a platform for conducting rigorous, transparent, and replicable testing of scientific theories, computing tools, and new technologies.

The term is used across many disciplines to describe experimental research and new product development platforms and environments. They may vary from hands-on prototype development in manufacturing industries such as automobiles (known as "mules"), aircraft engines or systems and to intellectual property refinement in such fields as computer software development shielded from the hazards of testing live.

== Software development ==
In software development, testbedding is a method of testing a particular module (function, class, or library) in an isolated fashion. It may be used as a proof of concept or when a new module is tested apart from the program or system it will later be added to. A skeleton framework is implemented around the module so that the module behaves as if already part of the larger program.

A typical testbed could include software, hardware, and networking components. In software development, the specified hardware and software environment can be set up as a testbed for the application under test. In this context, a testbed is also known as the test environment made of:

- Testing hardware equipment (test bench, optical table, custom testing rig, dummy equipment as simulates an actual product or its counterpart, external environment means, like showers, heaters, fans, vacuum chamber, anechoic chamber).
- Computing equipment (processing units, data centers, in-line FPGA, environment simulation equipment).
- Testing software (DAQ / oscilloscopes, visualisation and testing software, environment software to feed dummy equipment with data).

Testbeds are also pages on the Internet where the public are given the opportunity to test CSS or HTML they have created and want to preview the results, for example:

- The Arena web browser was created by the World Wide Web Consortium (W3C) and CERN for testing HTML3, Cascading Style Sheets (CSS), Portable Network Graphics (PNG) and the libwww.
- The Line Mode browser got a new function to interact with the libwww library as a sample and test application.
- The libwww was also created to test network communication protocols which are under development or to experiment with new protocols.

== Aircraft development ==
In aircraft development there are also examples of testbed use like in development of new aircraft engines when these are fitted to a testbed aircraft for flight testing. Such usage of testbeds was originally pioneered by Rolls Royce in their development of jet engines.

== See also ==
- Iron bird (aviation)
