= Henrik Frystyk Nielsen =

Danish engineer and computer scientist

Henrik Frystyk Nielsen (born 1969) is a Danish engineer and computer scientist. He is best known for his pioneering work on the World Wide Web and subsequent work on computer network protocols.

== Biography ==
Henrik Frystyk Nielsen was born 1 August 1969 in Copenhagen, Denmark.

Frystyk Nielsen received a master's degree in Engineering of Telecommunications from Aalborg University in Denmark in August 1994.

Frystyk Nielsen's Web work began at CERN, when he became Tim Berners-Lee's first graduate student, and shared an office with Håkon Wium Lie, the co-inventor of Cascading Style Sheets. They developed together the Arena web browser. It was at this time he began work with Berners-Lee, and later joined Roy Fielding et al. Frystyk Nielsen was invited by Berners-Lee to join the technical staff of the newly formed World Wide Web Consortium (W3C) in 1994. He joined the staff of W3C in March 1995, and continued work on HTTP and other Web protocol topics such as the Line Mode Browser and libwww.

Frystyk Nielsen was one of the principal authors of the Hypertext Transfer Protocol (HTTP) specifications, published in 1996. He then managed the development of a "next generation" called HTTP 1.1, published in 1999. He left W3C in July 1999.

Frystyk Nielsen joined the staff of Microsoft in August 1999, and began work on SOAP 1.1. Previous versions of SOAP had been proposed as an XML-based object serialization protocol, such as XML-RPC but through the input of Frystyk Nielsen, Noah Mendelsohn, and others, SOAP 1.1 grew into a lightweight message-oriented protocol for exchanging semi-structured information in a highly decentralized environment. In 2000, Frystyk Nielsen joined as an editor the standardizing effort of SOAP within the W3C XML Protocol Working Group which eventually became SOAP 1.2.

In 2003, Frystyk Nielsen started an incubation project together with George Chrysanthakopoulos focusing on providing a new Web-oriented application model and associated programming model suited for highly concurrent and distributed environments. An output of the incubation is DSSP, a SOAP-based protocol that augments the Web and HTTP model with structured data manipulation and event notifications. By the end of 2005, the incubation moved into productization as Frystyk Nielsen and Chrysanthakopoulos joined the newly formed Microsoft Robotics Group. In June 2006 the first version of the Microsoft Robotics Studio shipped to the public. Frystyk Nielsen is currently the Principal Architect at Applied AI team at Microsoft, working on bringing AI to the edge.
