= Library for WWW in Perl =

LWP - The World-Wide Web library for Perl (also called libwww-perl) is a set of Perl modules that give Perl programming easy access to sending requests to the World Wide Web. libwww-perl provides an application programming interface (API) to an HTTP client as well as a number of HTML utilities, and standard objects to represent HTTP requests and responses.

== History ==
The first generation of libwww-perl was written by Roy Fielding using version 4.036 of Perl. Fielding's work on libwww-perl provided a backend HTTP interface for his MOMSpider Web crawler. Fielding's work on libwww-perl was informed by Tim Berners-Lee's work on libwww, and helped to clarify the architecture of the Web that was eventually documented in HTTP v1.0. The second generation of libwww-perl was based on version 5.004 of Perl, and written by Martijn Koster and Gisle Aas. The current version is 6.72.
