= W3C Software Notice and License =

Free software license by W3C

- Author: World Wide Web Consortium
- Latest version: 20021231
- Published: 31 December 2002; 23 years ago
- SPDX identifier: W3C-19980720, W3C-20150513, W3C
- Debian FSG compatible: Yes
- FSF approved: Yes
- OSI approved: Yes
- GPL compatible: Yes
- Copyleft: No
- Linking from code with a different license: Yes

The W3C Software Notice and License is a permissive free software license used by software released by the World Wide Web Consortium, like Amaya. The license is a permissive license, compatible with the GNU General Public License.

== Software using the License ==
- Arena
- Amaya
- Libwww
- Line Mode Browser

== See also ==
- Software using the W3C Software Notice and License (category)
- World Wide Web Consortium
