= Arena (web browser) =

Web browser and Web authoring tool for Unix

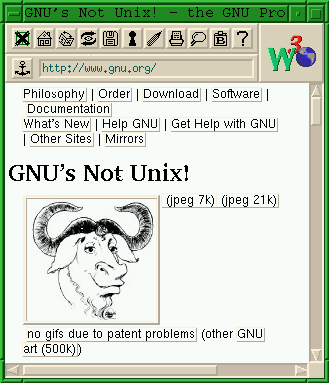
- Arena on www.gnu.org
- Original authors: Dave Raggett (1992–1994), Håkon Wium Lie, Henrik Frystyk Nielsen, Yves Lafon
- Developers: CERN/W3C; Yggdrasil Computing
- Release: pre 1993; 33 years ago Public: 0.91 24 October 1994; 31 years ago
- Final release: 0.3.62 / 25 November 1998; 27 years ago
- Written in: C
- Operating system: NeXT, Linux, Unix SunOS, Solaris, SGI, DEC, FreeBSD, X11(X)
- Available in: English
- Type: Web browser, HTML editor
- License: W3C, some parts GPL
- Website: www.w3.org/Arena/

The Arena browser (also known as the Arena WWW Browser) was one of the first web browsers for Unix. Originally begun by Dave Raggett in 1993, development continued at CERN and the World Wide Web Consortium (W3C) and subsequently by Yggdrasil Computing. Arena was used in testing the implementations for HTML version 3.0, Cascading Style Sheets (CSS), Portable Network Graphics (PNG), and libwww. Arena was widely used and popular at the beginning of the World Wide Web.

Arena, which predated Netscape Navigator and Microsoft's Internet Explorer, featured a number of innovations used later in commercial products. It was the first browser to support background images, tables, text flow around images, and inline mathematical expressions.

The Arena browser served as the W3C's testbed browser from 1994 to 1996 when it was succeeded by the Amaya project.

== History ==
Dave Raggett, realizing that there were not enough working hours left for him to succeed at what he felt was an immensely important task, continued writing his browser at home. There he would sit at a large computer that occupied a fair portion of the dining room table, sharing its slightly sticky surface with paper, crayons, Lego bricks and bits of half-eaten cookies left by the children.

— Web Browser History

In 1993, Dave Raggett, then at Hewlett-Packard (HP) in Bristol, England devoted his spare time to developing Arena on which he hoped to demonstrate new and future HTML specifications. Development of the browser was slow because Raggett was the lone developer and HP, which like many other computer corporations at the time, was unconvinced that the Internet would succeed and thus did not consider investing in web browser development. Raggett demonstrated the browser at the first World Wide Web Conference in Geneva, Switzerland in 1994 and the 1994 ISOC conference in Prague to show text flow around images, forms, and other aspects of HTML later termed as the HTML+ specification. Raggett subsequently partnered with CERN, to develop Arena further as a proof of concept browser for this work. Using the Arena browser, Dave Raggett, Henrik Frystyk Nielsen, Håkon Wium Lie and others demonstrated text flow around a figure with captions, resizable tables, image backgrounds, HTML math, and other features. At the Web World conference in Orlando, in early 1995, Raggett demonstrated the different new features of Arena.

Since July 1994 Lie was integrating libwww and CSS and helping Raggett. In October 1995, Yves Lafon joined the team for a year to provide support for HTML form and style sheet development.

Arena was originally released for Unix, and although there was talk of a Windows and Macintosh port, neither came to fruition.

Despite its time of development, Arena is in certain areas a relatively modern browser; because it functioned as a testbed, it saw the implementation of new technologies long before they became mainstream, e.g. CSS. Arena implemented many elements of the HTML3 and HTML3.2 specification including math elements that were deprecated in HTML4, HTML tables, and experimental style sheets.

=== W3C pre-Beta ===
The development history and the source code of earlier software builds are not well documented, because the developers did not want to distribute the source code until they considered the browser to be stable. In version 0.95, support for inline JPEG images was added. In version 0.96, support was added for the FTP, NNTP, and Gopher protocols, as well as experimental support for CSS. In Arena 0.98 Dave Beckett added full PNG support.

=== W3C Beta-1 ===
The W3C published 5 versions of the Arena beta-1 between 27 November 1995 and 8 February 1996 improving 16-bit operating system support and reimplementing CSS (which was still a Working Draft). The W3C and the INRIA, a French national research institution, gave additional funding to develop CSS. To better implement and write CSS, an experimental style sheet for Arena was developed. On 22 May 1996, the W3C announced that Amaya will replace Arena as their new testbed and that the W3C was looking for a new maintainer because the W3C did not have the resources for two testbeds.

=== W3C Beta-2 ===
How Arena works:

W3C Arena:
W3C's:
 +======+     HTTP       +======+    +======+    +======+
 |Server|--------------->|Buffer|--->|Frame |--->|X11R6 |
 +======+ |              +======+ |  +======+ |  +======+
          |                       |           |
      +---+----+  +--------+  +---+----+  +---+------+
      | libwww |  |  code  |  | HTML   |  | drawing  |
      |        |  |  conv  |  | parser |  | routine  |
      +---+----+  +---+----+  +---+----+  +---+------+
OMRON's:  |           |           |           |
 +======+ |  +======+ |  +======+ |  +======+ |  +======+
 |Server|----|TmpBuf|--->|Buffer|--->|Frame |--->|X11R6 |
 +======+    +======+    +======+    +======+    +======+
         HTTP            Internal
                         CharCode

Beta-2 had two builds (beta-2a: 28 February 1996 and beta-2b: 21 March 1996) and introduced a new API for communicating with other applications. Also, the internal component libwww was updated to version 4. OMRON Corporation developed an internationalized version that could display Chinese, Korean and Japanese characters in one page. OMRON's Arena supports both ISO-2022 and Unicode. It is able to guess the charset parameter automatically if charset parameter isn't specified in Content-Type field.

=== W3C Beta-3 ===
Beta-3a released on 14 August 1996 and Beta-3b released on 16 September 1996 introduced support for the Linux operating systems on m68k and DEC Alpha. CSS 1 support was enhanced and the internationalized version was also updated. Between the two beta-3 releases the W3C was already looking at a new testbed and switched later to the Amaya browser. Beta-3 was the last involvement of the W3C in the development of Arena. On 17 February 1997, Yggdrasil Computing took over the role of developing the browser.

=== Yggdrasil phase ===
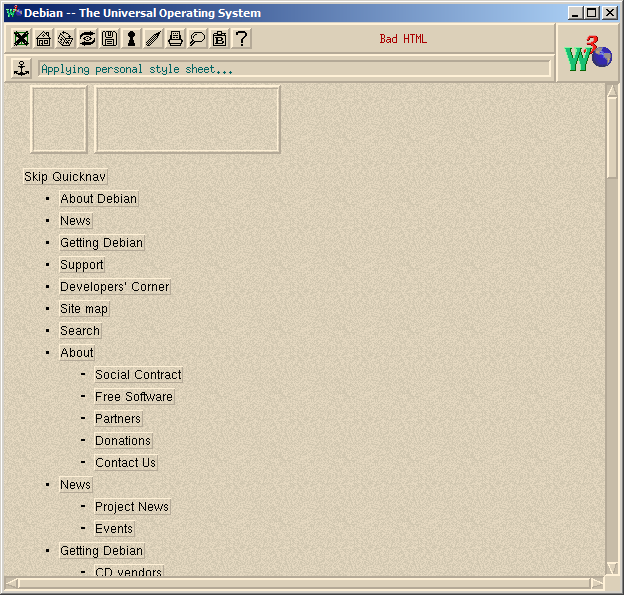
The latest Arena 0.3.62-1 build on its start page

On 17 February 1997, the W3C approved Yggdrasil to coordinate future development of Arena. Development was taken over by Yggdrasil, with the idea to turn Arena into an open source X Window System browser licensed under the GNU General Public License. Yggdrasil licensed an X emulator from Pearl Software to port Arena to Windows, although these builds were never released. Yggdrasil did not provide any official binaries at this time, because they did not want to expand the community with alpha-quality software. Although users would be able to run Arena by compiling it from the published source code, volunteers created unofficial finished binaries. Yggdrasil had planned to implement browsing features that were already standard in competitive web browsers, which resulted in the new bookmarks feature in version 0.3.18 on 7 April 1997.

Development stopped in late 1998, with the final release being on 25 November 1998. (Note: Because the official page is no longer online, the older source code and precompiled builds of Yggdrasil's development are no longer available, although Debian's repository archive contains the three newest builds.) The W3C did not consider demonstration projects to be high priority, and thus, the Arena browser was entirely shut down in favor of outside Linux-community development.

== Features ==
Arena supported the following features:

- HTML3.0 – the HTML3.2 standard predecessor, which includes <math>, tables, forms, etc.
- CSS1
- style sheet editing. This very experimental style sheet editor was implemented using forms
- editing remote HTML pages
- MIME (reads your mailcap file and applies the rules)
- direct access to WAIS engines (optionally)
- HTTP 1.1 proposed by RFC 2068 (formerly called HTTP-NG)
- HTML editing with external editor
- external client communication (API and HTML "mailto:" scheme)
- PNG, JPEG, GIF (but not animated GIFs)
- Bookmarks (since 0.3.18)
- full XPM (since 0.3.33) and full XBM (since 0.3.34)
- Java applets (since 0.3.39)
- HTML Table support
- HTML Math equations
- Link rendition
- FTP, NNTP, Gopher

== Technical ==
Arena was built using the multi-threaded library of common code called the W3C Reference Library, now called libwww. Originally, the Arena browser was built on top of Xlib as Raggett considered the programming manuals for Motif and other X libraries to be rather daunting.

=== Version numbering ===
Arena has three different systems for the version numbering. The W3C pre-beta phase uses a system of numbers up to 0.99, which indicated that these builds were in alpha-quality and the browser could have new features. The beta phase changed the version numbering to a system consisting of the word "Beta-" beta followed by a number. After the beta-phase, the final product would have the version 1.0. After Yggdrasil overtook the development, the development status was changed from the W3C beta builds back to alpha, implying that the Arena browser wasn't yet ready for release. The beta-3e version numbering then became 0.3.5 in GNU style Development remained in alpha stage until 0.3.62, and never again advanced to beta.

== Criticism ==
Although Arena ran well, there were inconsistent reports about the speed of Arena.

The biggest problems were that Arena couldn't handle forms, and that the PNG support was broken from version 0.3.07 on. Earlier Arena releases had full alpha-channel support, but only with using Arena's own "sandy" background pattern. The animated GIFs extension – presented by Netscape in March 1996 – did not work properly.

Other problems included rendering problems with tables, and the lack of integration of so-called extended HTML code, i.e. the <BG COLOR>-tag and the <DIV ALIGN>-tag.

Earlier versions of Arena (until 0.3.26 (01.06.97)) did not support the email MIME.

== Screenshots ==
Screenshots of the unreleased development of the W3C Arena version 1.0a
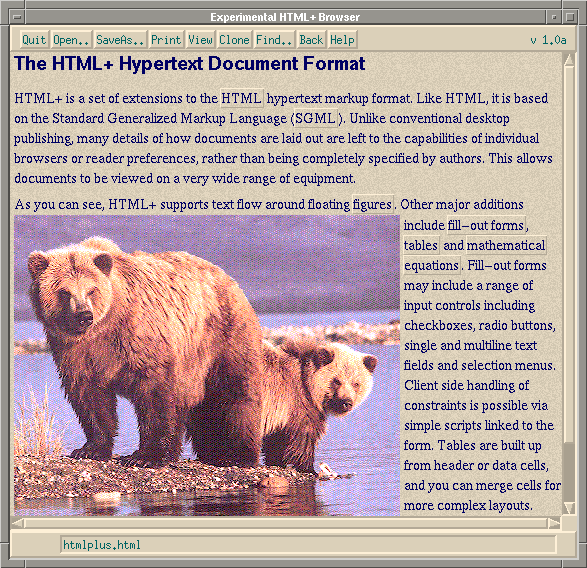
HTML+ document rendered

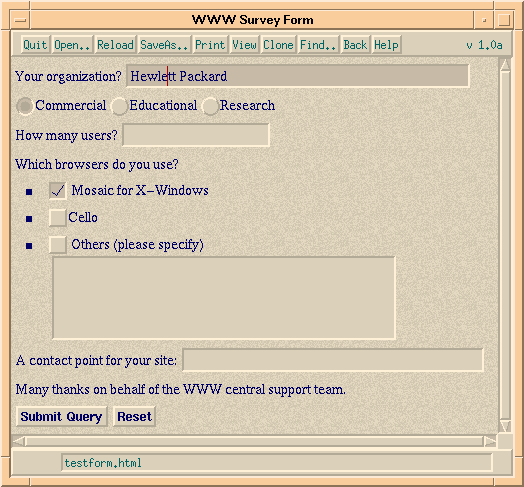
HTML form

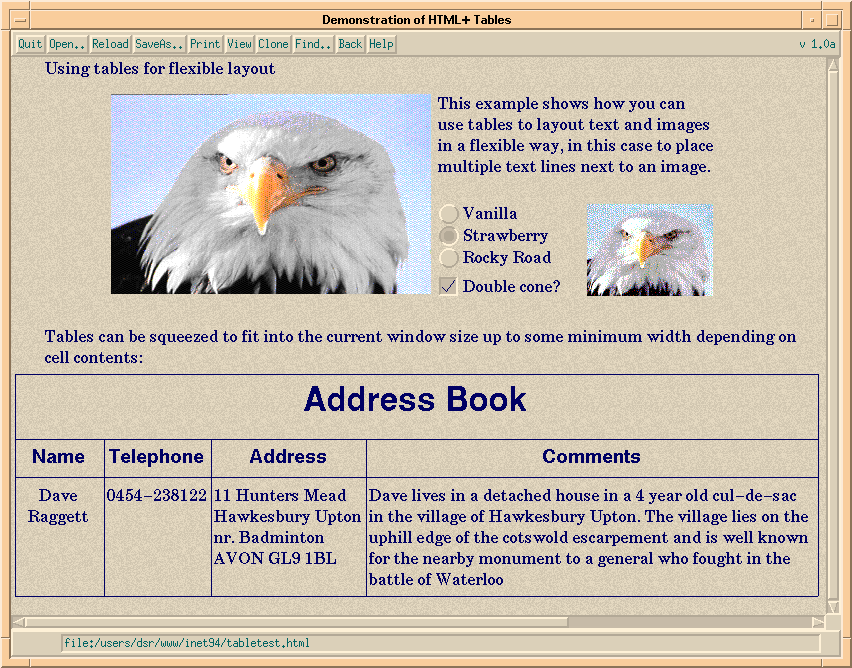
HTML+ table

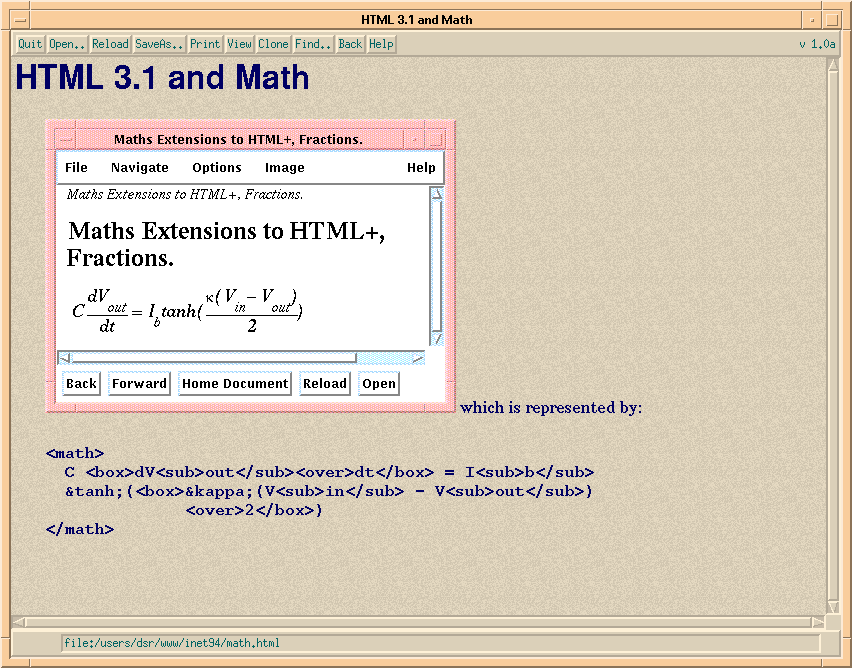
HTML3.1 and math

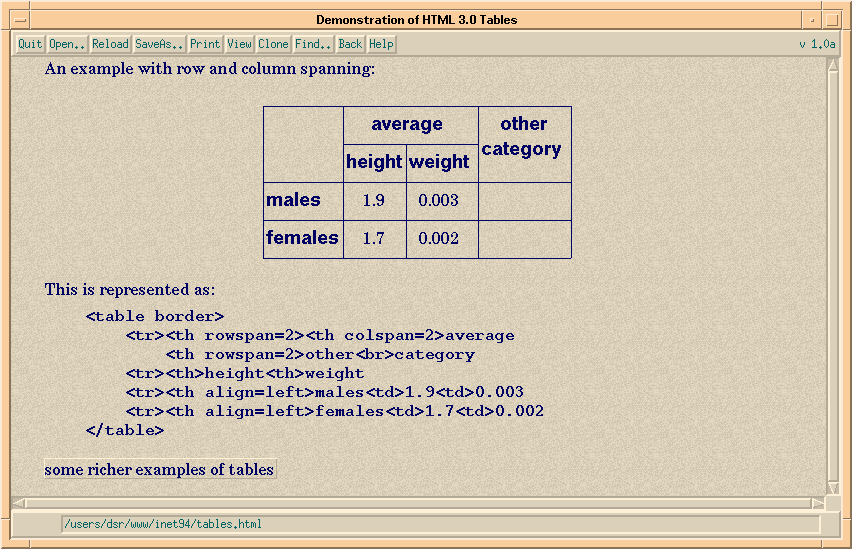
HTML3.0 table

== Bibliography ==
- Raymond, Eric S. (26 March 1997). "The Linux XFree86 HOWTO". Archived from the original on 20 July 2011.
- Ford, Andrew (1995). Spinning the web: how to provide information on the Internet. International Thomson Pub. p. 6.
- Raggett, Dave; Lam, Jenny; Alexander, Ian (April 1996). HTML 3: electronic publishing on the World Wide Web. Addison-Wesley. ISBN 978-0-201-87693-2. Archived from the original on 19 March 2015.
- Flynn, Peter (1995). The World Wide Web handbook: a guide for users, authors, and publishers. International Thomson Computer Press. ISBN 978-1-85032-205-4. Archived from the original on 19 March 2015.
- Reilly, Edwin D. (2003). Milestones in computer science and information technology. Greenwood Publishing Group. p. 33. ISBN 978-1-57356-521-9.
