= Robert Cailliau =

Belgian engineer, computer scientist, and co-inventor of the World Wide Web

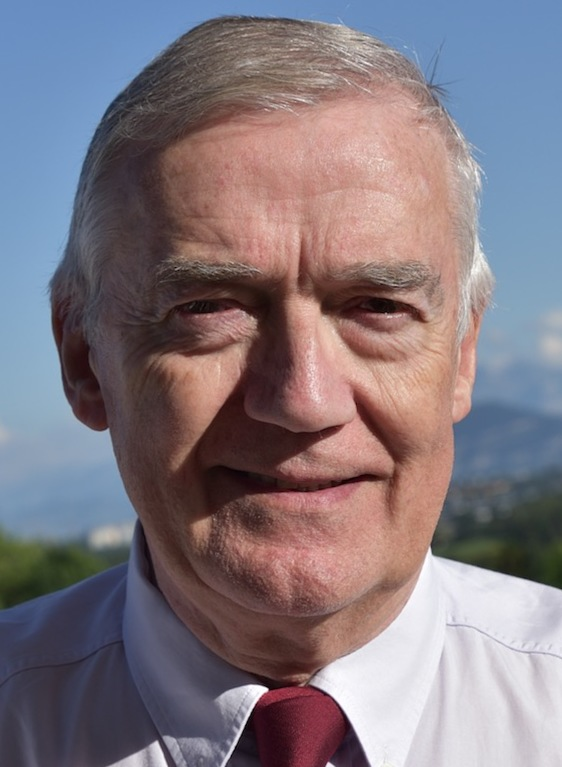
- Cailliau in 2019
- Born: 26 January 1947 (age 79); Tongeren, Belgium
- Education: Ghent University; University of Michigan
- Website: www.cailliau.org

Robert Cailliau (French pronunciation: [kajo]; born 26 January 1947) is a Belgian informatics engineer who proposed the first (pre-www) hypertext system for CERN in 1987 and collaborated with Tim Berners-Lee on the World Wide Web (jointly winning the ACM Software System Award) from before it got its name. He designed the historical logo of the WWW, organized the first International World Wide Web Conference at CERN in 1994 and helped transfer Web development from CERN to the global Web consortium in 1995. He is listed as co-author of How the Web Was Born by James Gillies, the first book-length account of the origins of the World Wide Web.

== Biography ==
Cailliau was born in Tongeren, Belgium. In 1958 he moved with his parents to Antwerp. After secondary school he graduated from Ghent University in 1969 as civil, mechanical and electrical engineering (Dutch: Burgerlijk Werktuigkundig en Elektrotechnisch ingenieur). He also has an MSc from the University of Michigan in Computer, Information and Control Engineering, 1972.

During his military service in the Belgian Army, he maintained Fortran programs to simulate troop movements.

Historical World Wide Web logo designed by Robert Cailliau

In December 1974 he started working at CERN as a Fellow in the Proton Synchrotron (PS) division, participating in the renovation project of the control system of the accelerator. In April 1987 he left the PS division to become group leader of Office Computing Systems in the Data Handling division. In 1989, Tim Berners-Lee proposed a hypertext system for access to the many forms of documentation at and related to CERN. Berners-Lee created the system, calling it World Wide Web, between September and December 1990. During this time, Cailliau and he co-authored a proposal for funding for the activity. Cailliau later became a key proponent of CERN's web activity, running several student projects to create and support browsers on different operating systems including various UNIX flavours and Classic Mac OS. With Nicola Pellow he helped develop the first web browser for the Classic Mac OS operating system called MacWWW.

In 1993, in collaboration with the Fraunhofer-Gesellschaft Cailliau started the European Commission's first web-based project for information dissemination in Europe (WISE).

As a result of his work with CERN's Legal Service, CERN's director of Future Research Walter Hoogland signed the official document that released the web technology into the public domain on 30 April 1993.

In December 1993 Cailliau called for the first International WWW Conference which was held at CERN in May 1994. The oversubscribed conference brought together 380 web pioneers and was a milestone in the development of the web. The conference led to the forming of the International World Wide Web Conferences Steering Committee which has organized an annual conference since then. Cailliau was founding member of the committee from 1994 until 2002.

In 1995 Cailliau started the "Web for Schools" project with the European Commission, introducing the web as a resource for education. After helping to transfer the web development from CERN to the World Wide Web Consortium (W3C), he devoted his time to public communication. He went on retirement from CERN in January 2007.

Cailliau was an active member of Newropeans, a pan-European political movement for which he and Luca Cominassi drafted a proposal concerning the European information society.

He was a public speaker on the past and future of the World Wide Web and has delivered many keynote speeches at international conferences. He currently has the status of External Collaborator at CERN IdeaSquare.

== Awards ==
- 1995: ACM Software System Award (with Tim Berners-Lee)
- 1999: Christophe Plantin Prize, Antwerp
- 1999: Dr. Hon. Southern Cross University
- 2000: Dr. Hon. University of Ghent
- 2001: Médaille Genève Reconnaissante (with Tim Berners-Lee)
- 2004: Commander in the Order of King Leopold (awarded by King Albert II of Belgium)
- 2006: Honorary citizenship of the city of Tongeren
- 2008: Gold Medal of the Flemish Academy of Sciences and the Arts
- 2009: Dr. Hon. University of Liège (with Tim Berners-Lee)
- 2010: Ehrenpreis Best of Swiss Web
- 2012: Internet Hall of Fame by the Internet Society
- 2021: Dr. Hon. from the University of Michigan for his co-creation (as cited by the ACM in its 1995 award to Cailliau) of the World-Wide-Web
- 2023: Honorary Member of the Alumni Society of Engineers of Ghent university

== See also ==
- History of the World Wide Web

== Bibliography ==
- How the Web Was Born (Oxford University Press)
- Publications in DBLP Computer Science Library
