= Berners-Lee =

Berners-Lee may refer to:

- Conway Berners-Lee (1921–2019), British mathematician and computer scientist, father of Mike and Tim Berners-Lee
- Mike Berners-Lee (born 1964), English researcher and writer on greenhouse gases
- Tim Berners-Lee (born 1955), British engineer and computer scientist, known for his creation of the World Wide Web

== See also ==
- 13926 Berners-Lee, main-belt asteroid
