= Yardleys School =

Location
- Reddings Lane; Tyseley; Birmingham, West Midlands, B11 3EY; England
- Coordinates: 52.4506°N 1.8441°W

Information
- Type: Academy
- Local authority: Birmingham City Council
- Department for Education URN: 139994 Tables
- Ofsted: Reports
- Headteacher: Gurpreet Basra
- Gender: Mixed
- Age: 11 to 16
- Enrolment: 918 as of March 2016
- Website: http://www.yardleys-vle.com/

Yardleys School is a mixed secondary school located in the Tyseley area of Birmingham, in the West Midlands of England.

== Admissions ==
Yardleys School was originally located over two sites, the school relocated to a new location and building in 2001, on the site of a former brickworks. The school converted to academy status in August 2013, but coordinates with Birmingham City Council for admissions.

== History ==
Yardley County Grammar School was opened by Worcestershire County Council in 1904, moving to a new site in 1910.

The school originates from Yardley Grammar School, and Formans Road Secondary Modern School. Yardley Grammar School became Yardleys Comprehensive School in 1974 when it merged with Leys Secondary School (Formans Road). The school closed in 2002 to be re-opened the same year as Yardleys School in a new school building built on the school playing fields . The old grammar school building was demolished in 2007.

== Notable former pupils ==
=== Yardley Grammar School ===
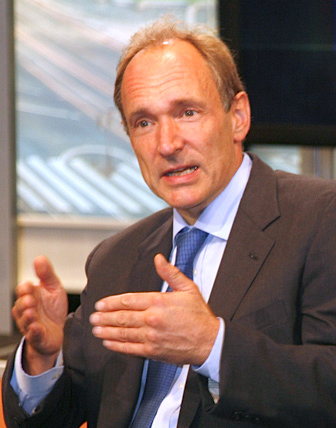
Sir Tim Berners-Lee, son of the mathematician Mary Lee Woods

- Harold Ball, Keeper of Palæontology from 1966–86 at the British Museum, and President from 1981-84 of the Society for the History of Natural History
- Prof Paul Harris, Professor of Screen Media since 2014 at the University of Dundee, and Dean of Duncan of Jordanstone College of Art and Design
- Denny Laine, guitarist with The Moody Blues who sang Go Now in 1964...the song reached number one in the British charts in January 1965. Denny joined Paul McCartney in Wings in August 1971 (having been a friend of Paul and the Beatles since the 'Moodies' had supported them during their UK tour of December 1965).
- Prof David S. Ingram OBE, botanist, and Master from 2000-07 of St Catharine's College, Cambridge
- Sir Keith O'Nions FRS, President & Rector of Imperial College London since 2010, and Chief Scientific Adviser to the Ministry of Defence from 2000-04
- Dave Pegg, bass guitar player with Fairport Convention
- Sir Robert Richard Taylor OBE, Lord Lieutenant of the West Midlands from 1993–2007, Managing Director from 1986-94 of Birmingham Airport, and Chairman from 1987-88 of the Airport Operators Association
- Ian Walters, sculptor
- Mary Lee Woods, mathematician who married Conway Berners-Lee, and her son Sir Tim Berners-Lee invented the World Wide Web; at Manchester under John Makepeace Bennett, she developed the Ferranti Mark 1, the world's first commercial computer.
- Mick Webley, guitarist with The Renegades 1967-1971 and later with Kim and the Cadillacs 1977-1987
