= Rosemary Leith =

Businesswoman and internet aficionado

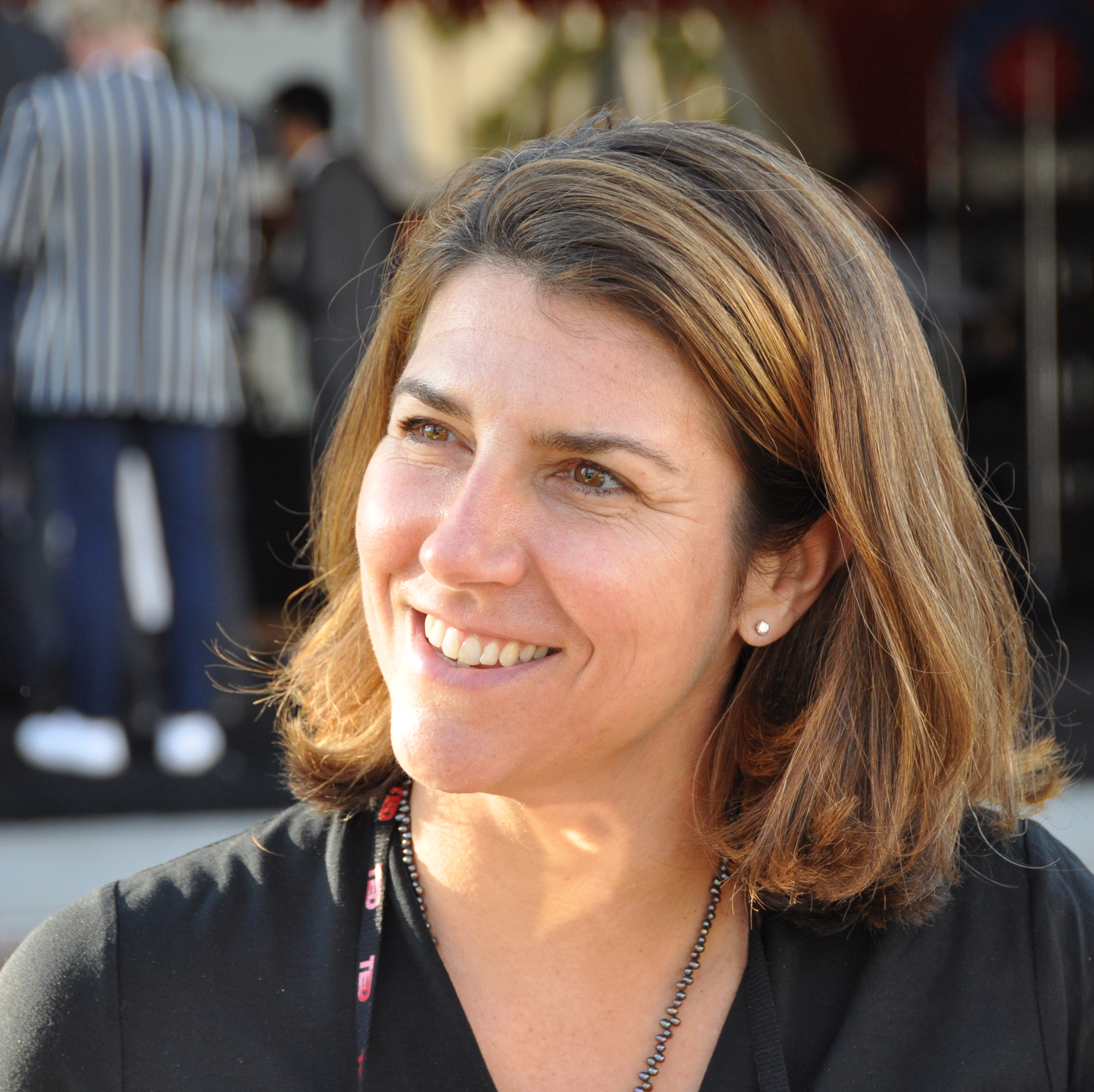
- Leith at TED 2009
- Born: Rosemary Blaire Leith; September 1961 (age 64); Toronto, Ontario, Canada
- Title: Lady Berners-Lee (Note: Tim Berners-Lee was knighted in 2004, so Leith became entitled to use the "Lady" honorific upon their marriage in 2014. The traditional style is "Lady Berners-Lee", but she is sometimes referred to as "Lady Rosemary Leith Berners-Lee".)
- Spouses: Mark Opzoomer (div.); Sir Tim Berners-Lee (m. 2014)
- Children: 3 children and 2 step-children
- Relatives: Conway Berners-Lee (father-in-law); Mary Lee Woods (mother-in-law)

Rosemary Blaire Leith, Lady Berners-Lee (born September 1961), is a Canadian-born British director of both for-profit and non-profit organizations. She co-founded the World Wide Web Foundation in 2009 with Sir Tim Berners-Lee, whom she married in 2014.

== Life and career ==
Leith was born in September 1961, in Toronto, Canada, and studied at Queen's University at Kingston. She moved to London during the late 1980s.

During the dot-com bubble at the end of the twentieth century, Leith co-founded the webzine Flametree with Jayne Buxton, an acquaintance from Queen's University who also lived in West London. At that time, Leith was quoted as saying: "Women go on the net with a purpose, not to play. They have less free time and are solution-driven. They want well-grounded advice that will help them to get things done."

Leith co-founded the World Wide Web Foundation in 2009 with Sir Tim Berners-Lee, who had invented the web. She is a fellow at Harvard's Berkman Klein Center for Internet & Society. Leith's directorships have included YouGov, an international research and data analytics group.

She is active in a number of arts organisations, advising on strategy and fundraising. Leith was appointed, along with Katrin Henkel, as a trustee of the National Gallery in London for a four-year term from March 2016. It was announced in December 2020 that both women had their terms extended for another four years to November 2024, Leith's contributions to various boards of directors of arts institutions in London over the previous twenty years being noted.

In June 2021, Sir Tim Berners-Lee auctioned the source code from the web as a non-fungible token (NFT) at Sotheby's. The proceeds, some $5,434,500, were reported to be put towards initiatives by the husband and wife team.

== Marriages and children ==
Leith was married firstly to Mark Opzoomer, with whom she had three children. They lived in Fulham, West London.

She married Sir Tim Berners-Lee in 2014. The wedding was held at the Chapel Royal, St James’s Palace.
