= Weaving the Web =

1999 book by Tim Berners-Lee

Weaving the Web: The Original Design and Ultimate Destiny of the World Wide Web by its inventor
- First edition
- Authors: Tim Berners-Lee, Mark Fischetti
- Subject: World Wide Web
- Publisher: Harper
- English publication date: 1999
- Pages: 226
- ISBN: 0-06-251586-1

Weaving the Web: The Original Design and Ultimate Destiny of the World Wide Web by its inventor (1999) is a book written by Tim Berners-Lee describing how the World Wide Web was created and his role in it.

== Intercreativity ==
The concept of intercreativity was introduced by Berners-Lee in this book. It was used to refer to the interconnection of the Internet and creativity, and also to articulate the close link between interactivity and creativity, as it underscores the possibilities of creating together, and being creative together.

In his 2025 book This is for Everyone, Tim Berners-Lee calls intercreativity the core principle of the Web and cites Wikipedia as an example of what intercreativity can do. He writes:

Wikipedia has grown to contain millions of articles on every subject known to our species – an invaluable repository of human knowledge that I consider one of the modern wonders of the world. What made this system work was intercreativity – a group of people being creative. Wikipedia is probably the best single example of what I wanted the web to be.

Writers such as Graham Meikle and Jean Elizabeth Burgess have also worked on this concept.
