= List of awards and honours received by Tim Berners-Lee =

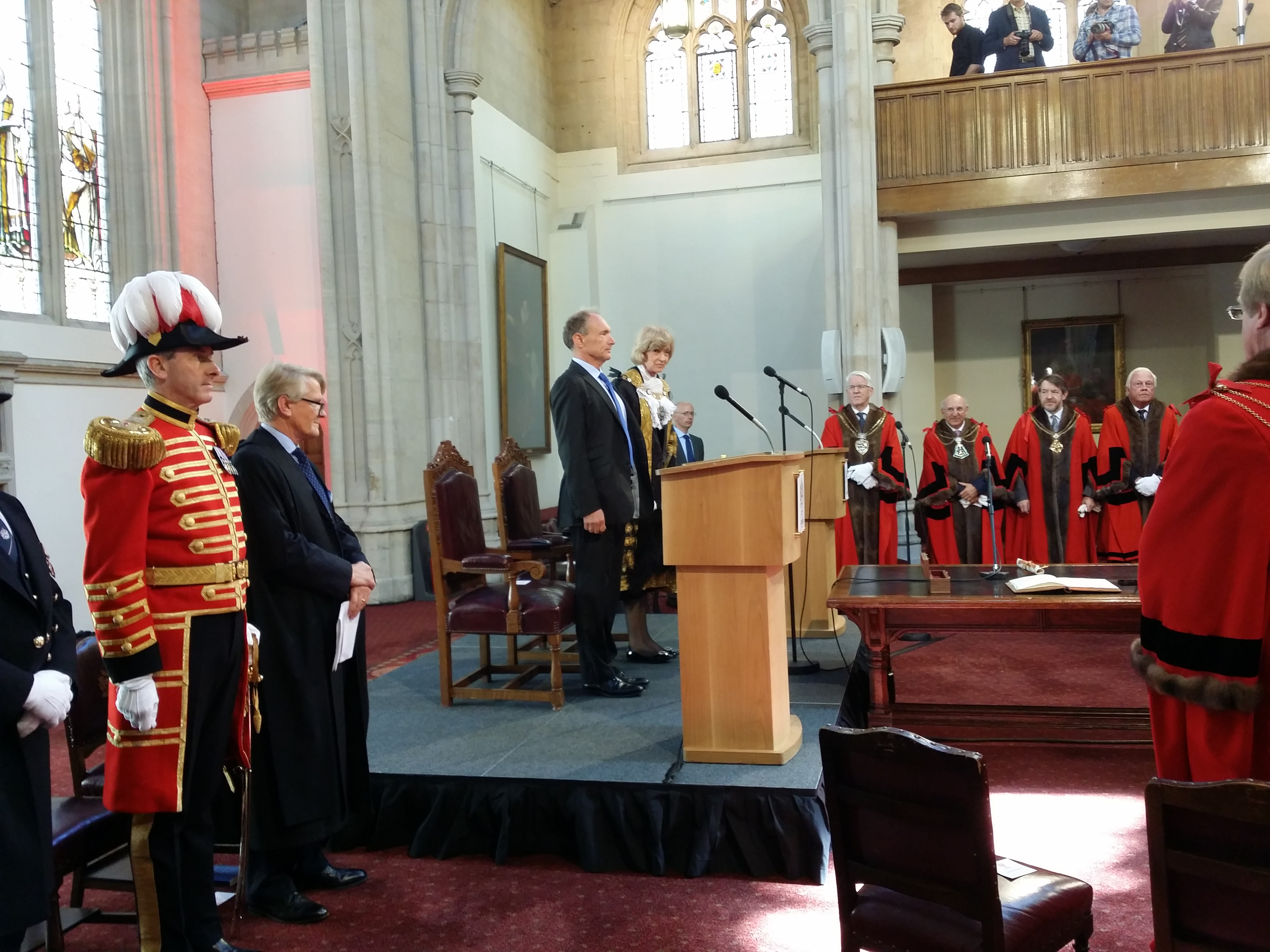
Berners-Lee receives the Freedom of the City of London, at the Guildhall, in 2014

Sir Timothy John "Tim" Berners-Lee, OM, KBE, FRS, FREng, FRSA, DFBCS (born 8 June 1955), also known as "TimBL", the inventor of the World Wide Web, has received a number of awards and honours.

== Awards ==
- 1994: Became one of only six members of the World Wide Web Hall of Fame.
- 1995: Kilby Foundation's "Young Innovator of the Year" Award.
- 1995: The Software System Award from the Association for Computing Machinery (ACM).
- 1995: Distinguished Fellow of the British Computer Society (DFBCS)
- 1996: Honorary degree, University of Southampton.
- 1998: Honorary doctorate, University of Essex.
- 1998: The USENIX Lifetime Achievement Award, USENIX.
- 1999: Time Magazine named him one of the 100 Most Important People of the 20th century.
- March 2000: Honorary degree, The Open University as Doctor of the University.
- 2001: Elected a Fellow of the Royal Society
- 2001: Elected a Fellow of the American Academy of Arts and Sciences.
- 2002: Albert Medal (Royal Society of Arts)
- 2002: Named in the BBC's list of the 100 Greatest Britons following a UK-wide vote.
- 2003: The Royal Photographic Society's Progress Medal and Honorary Fellowship (HonFRPS) in recognition of any invention, research, publication or other contribution which has resulted in an important advance in the scientific or technological development of photography or imaging in the widest sense.
- 2003: Received the Computer History Museum's Fellow Award, for his seminal contributions to the development of the World Wide Web.
- 15 April 2004: First recipient of Finland's Millennium Technology Prize, for inventing the World Wide Web. The cash prize, worth one million euros (about £678,701, or US$1.24 million, in 2004), was awarded on 15 June, in Helsinki, Finland, by the President of the Republic of Finland, Tarja Halonen.
- July 21, 2004: Honorary Doctor of Science degree, Lancaster University.
- 27 January 2005: Named Greatest Briton of 2004, both for his achievements and for displaying the key British characteristics of "diffidence, determination, a sharp sense of humour and adaptability", as put by David Hempleman-Adams, a panel member.
- 2006: Awarded the Lovelace Medal by the British Computer Society for his inventing the World Wide Web
- 2006: Won President's Medal of the IOP
- 2007: Ranked Joint First, alongside Albert Hofmann, in The Telegraph's list of 100 greatest living geniuses.
- 2007: Golden Plate Award of the American Academy of Achievement
- 2008: IEEE/RSE Wolfson James Clerk Maxwell Award, for "conceiving and further developing the World Wide Web".
- 10 October 2008: Honorary doctorate, Universitat Oberta de Catalunya.
- 2 December 2008: Honorary doctorate, University of Manchester. His parents worked on the Manchester Mark 1 in the 1940s and 50s.
- 21 April 2009: Honorary doctorate, Universidad Politécnica de Madrid.
- 28 April 2009: Elected a foreign associate of the United States National Academy of Sciences.
- 8 June 2009: Webby Award for Lifetime Achievement, at the awards ceremony held in New York City.
- October 2009: Honorary doctorate, Vrije Universiteit Amsterdam
- 14 September 2010: Awarded UNESCO Niels Bohr Medal
- 30 March 2011: One of the first three recipients of the Mikhail Gorbachev award for "The Man Who Changed the World".
- 26 May 2011: Honorary Doctor of Science degree, Harvard University.
- 2011: Inducted into IEEE Intelligent Systems' AI's Hall of Fame for the "significant contributions to the field of AI and intelligent systems".
- 2012: Inducted into the Internet Hall of Fame by the Internet Society.
- 27 July 2012: Recognised for the invention of the World Wide Web in the 2012 Summer Olympics opening ceremony.
- 2013: One of five Internet and Web pioneers awarded the inaugural Queen Elizabeth Prize for Engineering.
- 13 September 2013: Honorary Doctor of Science degree, University of St Andrews.
- 19 May 2014: Honorary Doctor of Engineering and Technology degree, Yale University.
- 24 May 2014: Honorary Doctor of Science degree, Rensselaer Polytechnic Institute.
- 24 September 2014: Honorary Freedom of the City of London.
- 6 October 2014: Pride of Britain "Special Award for Outstanding Achievement".
- 7 December 2014: Mohammed bin Rashid Knowledge Award that was shared with Jimmy Wales.
- 29 April 2015: Gottlieb Duttweiler Prize in Zurich, Switzerland
- 8 February 2016: John Maynard Keynes Prize
- 4 April 2017: 2016 Turing Award "for inventing the World Wide Web, the first web browser, and the fundamental protocols and algorithms allowing the Web to scale"
- 2022: Seoul Peace Prize for inventing the World Wide Web, supporting policies to address unequal Internet access, and aiming to decentralize user data with the Solid project.

== National honours ==
=== United Kingdom ===
- 1997: Appointed an Officer of the Order of the British Empire (OBE) "for services to global computer networking".
- 2004: Promoted to Knight Commander of the Order of the British Empire (KBE) in the New Year Honours "for services to the global development of the Internet". Formally invested on 16 July 2004.
- 13 June 2007: Appointed a member of the Order of Merit (OM), an order restricted to 24 (living) members. (The Order of Merit is within the personal gift of the monarch, and does not require recommendation by ministers.)

=== Overseas ===
- 3 December 2012: The Sultan Qaboos Order for Culture, Science and Arts (First Class), conferred by The Sultan of Oman.
- 27 September 2015: Order of the Cross of Terra Mariana (Class I) (decree signed on 4 February 2015 by President of Estonia).

== Undated ==
Tim Berners Lee has received two awards, the dates of which are unknown:

- Fellow of the Royal Academy of Engineering (FREng)
- Fellow of the Royal Society of Arts (FRSA)
