= Mark Opzoomer =

British-Canadian business executive (born 1957)

- Born: July 1957 (age 68)
- Citizenship: United Kingdom; Canada
- Occupations: Business executive; Company director
- Known for: Chief Executive Officer, Rambler Media Group
- Spouse: Rosemary Leith (div.)

Mark William Opzoomer (born July 1957) is a British-Canadian business executive and company director. He served as managing director and regional vice-president of Yahoo! Europe in the early 2000s, and later became chief executive officer of Rambler Media (2007–2009).

== Education ==
Opzoomer graduated with an MBA from IMD, Lausanne, Switzerland. He qualified as a chartered accountant with PwC in 1981.

== Career ==
=== Early career ===
Opzoomer has held senior roles in media, telecommunications and technology companies, including positions at Virgin Communications, Sega Europe and publishing company Hodder Headline.

=== Yahoo! Europe ===
In July 2001, Yahoo! announced that Opzoomer would join Yahoo! Europe as managing director and regional vice-president, effective in September 2001.

=== Rambler Media ===
Opzoomer joined the board of Rambler Media as a non-executive director in 2005 and chaired its audit committee. He was appointed chief executive officer in March 2007. In February 2009, Rambler Media announced that Opzoomer would step down as chief executive effective 28 February 2009.

=== Later work and board roles ===
Opzoomer has been a director of Bond Capital Partners Ltd, a private investment firm.

He joined the board of Vext Science, Inc. in February 2022 and was appointed non-executive chairman in August 2024.

Opzoomer is also listed by the software company Trint as its board chair.

== Personal life ==
He married Rosemary Leith, later a founding director of the World Wide Web Foundation; the couple had three children, after which she left the financial sector, co-founding a start-up during the dot-com bubble.
