= Emily Witt =

American investigative journalist

- Born: 1981 (age 44–45)
- Citizenship: United States
- Education: Brown University Columbia University; Cambridge University
- Occupations: Journalist; Literary critic Writer
- Relatives: Stephen Witt (brother)
- Writing career
- Language: English
- Notable awards: Fulbright scholar Livingston Award (finalist)
- Website: emilywitt.net

Emily Witt is an American investigative journalist based in Brooklyn with a particular focus on modern dating from the feminine perspective.

== Life ==
Witt is a graduate of Brown University and the University of Cambridge. She also graduated from Columbia's graduate school of investigative journalism. While in Mozambique on a Fulbright scholarship, she reported on Mozambican cinema for U.N. news agencies including IRIN and PlusNews. She wrote for numerous publications and moved to New York City.

Witt is a staff writer for The New Yorker, and has written for numerous publications including The New York Times, Men's Journal, The New York Observer, n+1, the Oxford American, the London Review of Books, GQ, The Nation, and Miami New Times.

Her writing has been described as a blend of "personal writing with social analysis." Her book Future Sex explores how women see the dating world in the 21st century; Publishers Weekly described her book as "an illuminating, hilarious account of sex and dating in the digital age, when hook-up culture and technology have vastly altered the romantic landscape."

At age thirty, she found herself "single and heartbroken" and she resolved to explore why that was the case. Her focus shifted to dating and technology and sexuality; she traveled to San Francisco, dated often, and wrote about her encounters. She profiled the dating app Tinder.

Like most people I had started internet dating out of loneliness. I soon discovered, as most do, that it can only speed up the rate and increase the number of encounters with other single people, where each encounter is still a chance encounter.

— Emily Witt in 2014 in the London Review of Books

Witt noted that many coming-of-age novels rarely addressed the issue of sexuality from a feminine perspective. In Slate magazine in 2013, she noted that, in many classic novels, the subject of female sexuality was missing or subdued, in addition to having female characters being defined simply in opposition to dynamic male characters; when she turned to books written by men, she was turned off.

In 2024 her book Health and Safety: A Breakdown won the Los Angeles Times-Christopher Isherwood Prize for Autobiographical Prose.

The book chronicles the " psychedelics and Brooklyn’s underground party scene during the first Trump presidency." The judges said: “Emily Witt exposes a country in the throes of ongoing trauma in a coming-of-age memoir — keenly observed, unapologetically told — that feels scarily emblematic of our life and times.”

== Bibliography ==
=== Books ===
- Future Sex. New York: Farrar, Straus and Giroux. 2016. ISBN 978-0-86547-879-4.
- Nollywood: The Making of a Film Empire. New York: Columbia Global Reports. 2017. ISBN 978-0-9971264-8-8.
- Health and Safety. Pantheon. 2024-09-17. ISBN 978-0-593-31764-8.

=== Essays and reporting ===
- "The trip planners : the unusual couple behind an online encyclopedia of psychoactive substances". Letter from California. The New Yorker. 91 (37): 58–63. November 23, 2015.
- "The rules". The Talk of the Town. Hell, Yes. The New Yorker. 94 (48): 16–17. February 11, 2019.
- "The Last Rave". The New Yorker. Volume C, No. 20, July 8 & 15, 2024.

=== Book reviews ===
Year	Review article	Work(s) reviewed
2019	"A blizzard of prescriptions". London Review of Books. 41 (7): 23–26. 4 April 2019.	Beth Macy, Dopesick, Head of Zeus, 2019; Chris McGreal, American Overdose: The Opioid Tragedy in Three Acts, Faber, 2018; Sam Quinones, Dreamland: The True Tale of America's Opiate Epidemic, Bloomsbury, 2016)
