= Thinking machine =

Thinking machine or thinking machines may refer to:

- Thinking Machines Corporation, defunct supercomputer manufacturer, in business from 1982 to 1994
- Thinking Machines Lab, an artificial intelligence company launched in 2025
- Thinking machines (Dune), a collective term for artificial intelligence in the fictional Dune universe created by Frank Herbert in 1965
- The Thinking Machine: Jensen Huang, Nvidia and the World's Most Coveted Microchip, 2025 biography by Stephen Witt
- Professor Augustus S. F. X. Van Dusen, fictional detective known as "The Thinking Machine" in two 1900s novels and a series of detective short stories by Jacques Futrelle

== See also ==
- Artificial intelligence
