= Charles Finch-Knightley, 11th Earl of Aylesford =

British peer

Finch-Knightley in 1955

Charles Ian Finch-Knightley, 11th Earl of Aylesford, JP, DL (2 November 1918 – 19 February 2008), styled Lord Guernsey between 1940 and 1958, was a British peer.

== Biography ==
Lord Aylesford was the elder son of Charles Finch-Knightley, 10th Earl of Aylesford, by Aileen Jane, daughter of William McCormac Boyle. He was educated at Oundle School. He served in the Second World War where he was wounded. After the war he was appointed a Justice of the Peace for Warwickshire in 1948 and a Deputy Lieutenant of the county in 1954. He succeeded his father in the earldom in 1958. In 1974 he was appointed to the new post of Lord-Lieutenant of the West Midlands, a position he held until 1993.

Aylesford resided at Packington Old Hall, Warwickshire.

== Marriage & Children ==
Lord Aylesford married Margaret Rosemary Tyer (died 1989), daughter of Major Austin Arnold Tyer, in 1946. They had one son and two daughters:

- Heneage Charles Finch-Knightley, 12th Earl of Aylesford (born 27 March 1947)
- Lady Sarah Elizabeth Jane Finch-Knightley (born 14 July 1950, died 28 September 2005)
- Lady Clare Charlotte Rosemary Finch-Knightley (born 13 September 1959)

Aylesford died in February 2008, aged 89, and was succeeded by his only son, Heneage.

== The Genius of Waste Management ==
The growth of the waste industry in the 1980s was a boon to Lord Aylesford. His father had left the estate at Packington with huge death duties. To pay the bill the Earl and his son set about gravel pit recovery. The mining extraction created a huge hole in the estate: the decision made after the flurry of new legislation to fill it with landfill waste. The success of this project led by the agent on the site, helped a whole new industry begin. The Earl made a profit, as his agent created a new hill above the park covering a plateau of several acres. The consequence of this was for government re-cycling models in favour of landfill.

Honorary titles
New office	Lord-Lieutenant of the West Midlands; 1974–1993	Succeeded by Sir Robert Richard Taylor
Peerage of Great Britain
Preceded by Charles Daniel Finch-Knightley	Earl of Aylesford; 1958–2008	Succeeded by Heneage Charles Finch-Knightley
