= Contract for the Web =

Initiative to shape a better internet

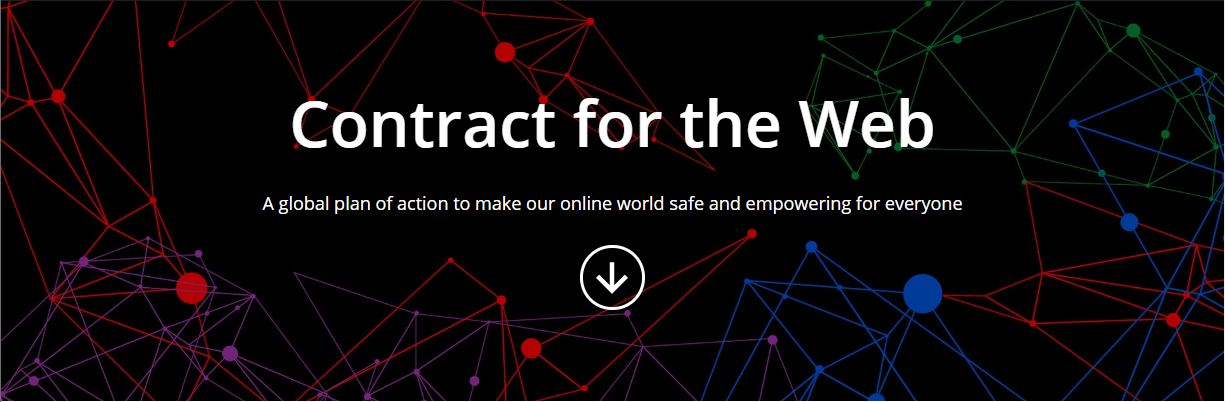
- Website type: Campaign
- Website: contractfortheweb.org
- Commercial: No
- Launched: 25 November 2019; 6 years ago

Contract for the Web is an initiative by the World Wide Web Foundation in November 2019 to attempt to address issues of political manipulation, fake news, privacy violations, and other malign forces on the internet.

== History ==
The initiative is the product of work for more than a year by over 80 people drawn from government, businesses and the general public.

== Initiative ==
The Contract for the Web gives us a roadmap to build a better web

— Tim Berners-Lee

The plan outlines nine central principles, three each directed at governments, companies and individuals. It was launched 25 November 2019 by Tim Berners-Lee of the World Wide Web Foundation, occurring before the start of the UN Internet Governance Forum meeting in Berlin.

Endorsing governments, companies and individuals make commitments to protecting the web from abuse and ensuring it benefits humanity. The commitment is understood to be non-binding.

=== Principles ===
Contract for the web indicates principles 1 to 3 are for governments, 4 to 6 are for companies, and 7 to 9 are for citizens:

1. "Ensure everyone can connect to the internet".
2. "Keep all of the internet available, all of the time".
3. "Respect and protect people’s fundamental online privacy and data rights".
4. "Make the internet affordable and accessible to everyone".
5. "Respect and protect people’s privacy and personal data to build online trust".
6. "Develop technologies that support the best in humanity and challenge the worst".
7. "Be creators and collaborators on the Web".
8. "Build strong communities that respect civil discourse and human dignity".
9. "Fight for the Web".

== Adoption ==
By launch the plan was backed by over 150 organisations including names such as Google, Microsoft and Facebook. Despite backing the plan, Facebook appeared to be ignoring Berners-Lee's request to Mark Zuckerberg to cease targeted political adverts for the 2019 United Kingdom general election. Yasmin Alibhai-Brown gave the opinion in the United Kingdom's 'i news': "It’s just good PR and a fun game for the megalomaniacs who will carry on doing their worst".

== Sources ==
- Alibhai-Brown, Yasmin (25 November 2019). "The new 'contract for the web' is just good PR for the tech megalomaniacs who will carry on doing their worst". i news. Archived from the original on 26 November 2019.
- BBC Staff (25 November 2019). "Contract for the Web: Sir Tim Berners-Lee launches global action plan". BBC Newsround. Archived from the original on 25 November 2019.
- Cellan-Jones, Rory (24 November 2019). "Sir Tim Berners-Lee attacks Tories over misinformation". BBC. Archived from the original on 25 November 2019.
- CNA Staff (25 November 2019). "Web inventor Tim Berners-Lee launches plan to stop Internet abuse". Archived from the original on 25 November 2019.
- Official website (25 November 2019). "Contract for the Web". Archived from the original on 25 November 2019.
- Sample, Ian (24 November 2019). "Tim Berners-Lee unveils global plan to save the web". The Guardian. Archived from the original on 25 November 2019.
- Sky Staff (25 November 2019). "WWW inventor Sir Tim Berners-Lee warns of 'digital dystopia' as he launches 'web contract'". Sky News. Archived from the original on 25 November 2019.
