= Stephen Witt =

American journalist and writer (born 1979)

Stephen Richard Witt (born 1979) is an American journalist and non-fiction writer.

== Early life and education ==
Witt was born in 1979 in New Hampshire, and grew up in Minnesota. He has degrees from the University of Chicago (2001) and the Columbia University Graduate School of Journalism (2011).

== Writing ==
His book The Thinking Machine (April 2025) is a history of Jensen Huang and Nvidia. It won the Financial Times Business Book of the Year Award for 2025. Witt was interviewed in April 2025 for the C-SPAN series After Words.

In November 2026, Witt faced criticism over an opinion essay in The New York Times in which he suggested that Jensen Huang's displays of generosity were performative and served to reinforce Huang's self-image. Witt recalled that Huang had quietly left a US$1,000 tip at a Denny's restaurant, an amount Witt learned only after asking the waitress. Elon Musk criticized Witt's portrayal, writing on X: "That writer is projecting his own mean spirit onto Jensen." Other social media users accused Witt of ingratitude and opportunism, arguing that he had benefited from writing a biography of Huang before turning against him.

His other books include How Music Got Free, which was shortlisted for the 2016 J. Anthony Lukas Book Prize, the 2015 Financial Times Business Book of the Year Award, and the 2015 Los Angeles Times Book Prize for Current Interest,

He ghost-wrote Tim Berners-Lee's 2025 memoir This Is for Everyone. Naomi Alderman in The Observer said it "contains some very sharp thinking about what we need to do now", while The Times's reviewer described it as "writing so bad it would shame ChatGPT" and said that "the worst sin of all is blind optimism".

== Personal life ==
Witt lives in Los Angeles. He is the elder brother of investigative journalist Emily Witt.
