= How Bad Are Bananas? =

2010 non-fiction book by Mike Berners-Lee

- UK 1st ed., 2010
- Author: Mike Berners-Lee
- Subject: Climate change
- Genre: Non-fiction
- Publisher: Profile Books
- Publication date: 2010
- ISBN: 9781846688911

How Bad Are Bananas? The Carbon Footprint of Everything is a 2010 non-fiction book by Mike Berners-Lee. The book details the carbon footprint of a wide range of activities and helps guide people towards less carbon-costly lifestyle options.

== Publication ==
The book is written by British writer and academic Mike Berners-Lee, who acknowledges throughout the book his use of estimates and imperfect calculations. It was first published in 2010; a second edition was published in the UK in 2020, and an "Updated North American edition", retitled The Carbon Footprint of Everything, in 2022.

- Berners-Lee, Mike (2010). How Bad Are Bananas? The Carbon Footprint of Everything:. London: Profile Books. ISBN 9781846688911.
- Second edition: Berners-Lee, Mike (2020). How bad are bananas? : the carbon footprint of everything (New ed.). London: Profile Books. ISBN 9781788163811.
- "Updated North American" edition: Berners-Lee, Mike (2022). The carbon footprint of everything. Vancouver: Greystone Books. ISBN 9781771645768.
- "French" edition: Berners-Lee, Mike (2025). Peut-on encore manger des bananes ?. Paris: Éditions J’ai Lu. ISBN 9782290421734.

== Synopsis ==
The book gives an approximate carbon footprint of just under 100 activities starting small, with carbon used in sending a text message, ending with the massive example of a World Cup. Commentary in the book helps the reader separate important decisions from trivial ones, for example highlighting that fresh food transported by air is more environmentally harmful than comparable produce transported by ship or truck.

The book compares methods of transport, including walking and cycling and details the differences in carbon footprint for human-powered transport based on the diet of the walkers and cyclists.

== Critical reception ==
Aaron Couch writing for The Christian Science Monitor praises Berners-Lee for his use of humour and for informing rather than preaching.

The Independent listed the book as one of its ten recommended "best books to help you live more sustainably."
