= Paul Sabapathy =

Paul Sabapathy CVO CBE
- Born: Chennai, India
- Occupation: Accountant

Paul Chandrasekharan Sabapathy CVO CBE is a retired British accountant and business manager, of Indian (Tamil) origin, and was Lord Lieutenant of the West Midlands of England, from 2007 until his resignation in September 2015. He was the first non-white Lord Lieutenant in the United Kingdom.

He was born in Chennai, India. and was educated at The Lawrence School, Lovedale, graduating in 1957 and Madras Christian College. He migrated to the United Kingdom in 1964, obtained a master's degree from Aston University and acquired British citizenship in 1984.

He is a Chartered Management Accountant and Chartered Global Management Accountant, and worked for IMI plc, and as assistant managing director of IMI Titanium before retiring in 1996.

He was chief executive of North Birmingham Community NHS Trust until 2000, and a pro chancellor of Birmingham City University.

Sabapathy was appointed Officer of the Order of the British Empire (OBE) in 1995 for services to Urban Regeneration, Commander of the Order of the British Empire (CBE) in 2004 for services to business and education in the West Midlands, and Commander of the Royal Victorian Order (CVO) in the 2017 Birthday Honours for his services as lord-lieutenant.
