= Mike Berners-Lee =

British ecologist and academic (born 1964)

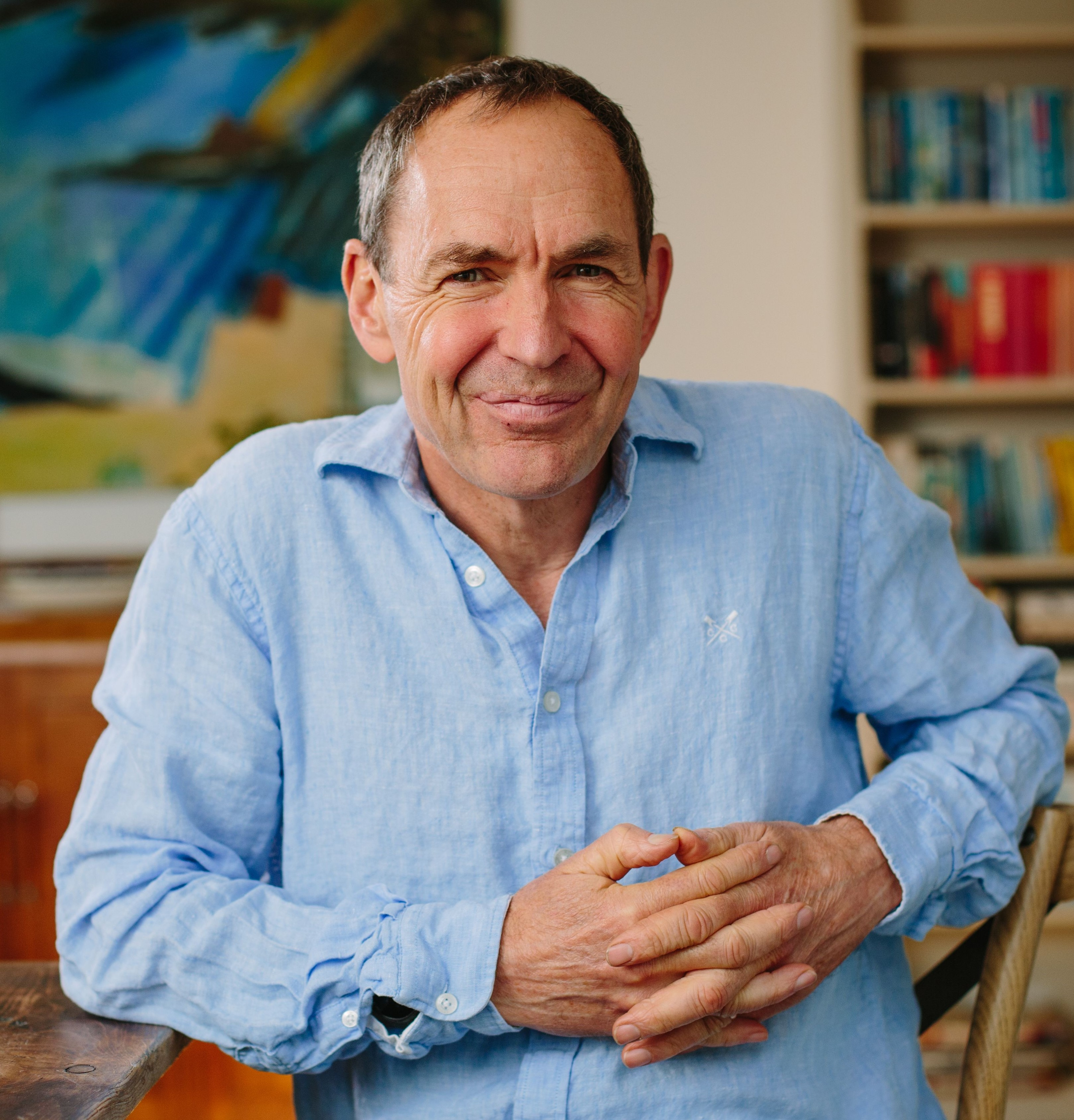
- Mike Berners-Lee (2023)
- Born: 1964 (age 61–62)
- Education: University of Oxford; Bangor University; Sheffield Hallam University
- Relatives: Mary Lee Woods (mother); Conway Berners-Lee (father); Tim Berners-Lee (brother)
- Writing career
- Notable work: How Bad Are Bananas? The Carbon Footprint of Everything (2010)

Mike Berners-Lee is an English researcher and writer on carbon footprinting. He is a professor in Practice at Lancaster University and director and principal consultant of Small World Consulting, based in the Lancaster Environment Centre at the university. His books include How Bad are Bananas?, The Burning Question, There Is No Planet B and A Climate of Truth, and he is a contributing author to The Climate Book created by Greta Thunberg. He is considered an expert on carbon footprints.

== Early life and education ==
He was born in 1964 and is the son of Mary Lee Woods and Conway Berners-Lee, who were both mathematicians and computer scientists. One of his brothers is computer scientist Sir Tim Berners-Lee, who invented the World Wide Web.

He graduated in physics from University of Oxford in 1986, gained a PGCE in Physics and Outdoor Education at Bangor University in 1988, and has a master's in Organisation Development and Consulting from Sheffield Hallam University (2001). He has been a professor in Practice at Lancaster University since 2016.

== Carbon accounting ==
Berners-Lee has pioneered carbon accounting of upstream carbon emissions from supply chains, known as scope 3 emissions, to assess the full greenhouse gas emissions of products. His work at Small World Consulting has combined Process-based Life Cycle Analysis with Environmentally Extended Input-Output Analysis to achieve both a system-complete estimate of the supply chain and specificity in key areas. He is also a leading researcher in assessing the full climate impacts of current and emerging ICT.

== Climate impact of food and land-use ==
His research has also examined the climate emissions from food and land-use, concluding that global food production can meet humanity's nutritional needs but only with a radical shift in dietary choices, so that less land is used for the relatively inefficient production of animal products with high greenhouse gas emissions, and more land is used to produce plant-based foods direct for human consumption.

== Selected publications ==
- Berners-Lee, Mike (2010). How Bad Are Bananas? The Carbon Footprint of Everything. Profile. ISBN 978-1-84668-891-1.
  - Second edition: Berners-Lee, Mike (2020). How bad are bananas?: the carbon footprint of everything (New ed.). London: Profile Books. ISBN 978-1-78816-381-1.
  - "Updated North American" edition: Berners-Lee, Mike (2022). The carbon footprint of everything. Vancouver: Greystone Books. ISBN 978-1-77164-576-8.
  - Berners-Lee, Mike (2024) Peut-On Encore Manger des Bananes? [How bad are bananas?] (in French) Translated by Bertrand Guillot (1 ed) France. ISBN 9789998772403
- Berners-Lee, Mike; Clark, Duncan (2013). The Burning Question: We Can't Burn Half the World's Oil, Coal and Gas. So How Do We Quit?. Profile. ISBN 978-1-78125-045-7.
- Berners-Lee, Mike (2019). There Is No Planet B: A Handbook for the Make or Break Years. Cambridge UP. ISBN 978-1-108-54596-9.
- Berners-Lee, Mike (2022). "How [Not] to Buy". In Thunberg, Greta (ed.). The Climate Book. Allen Lane. ISBN 978-0-241-54747-2.
- Berners-Lee, Mike (2025). A Climate of Truth: Why We Need It and How to Get It. Cambridge, United Kingdom: Cambridge University Press. ISBN 978-1-009-44006-6. OCLC 1473687765.
