= Mary Lee Woods =

British mathematician and computer programmer

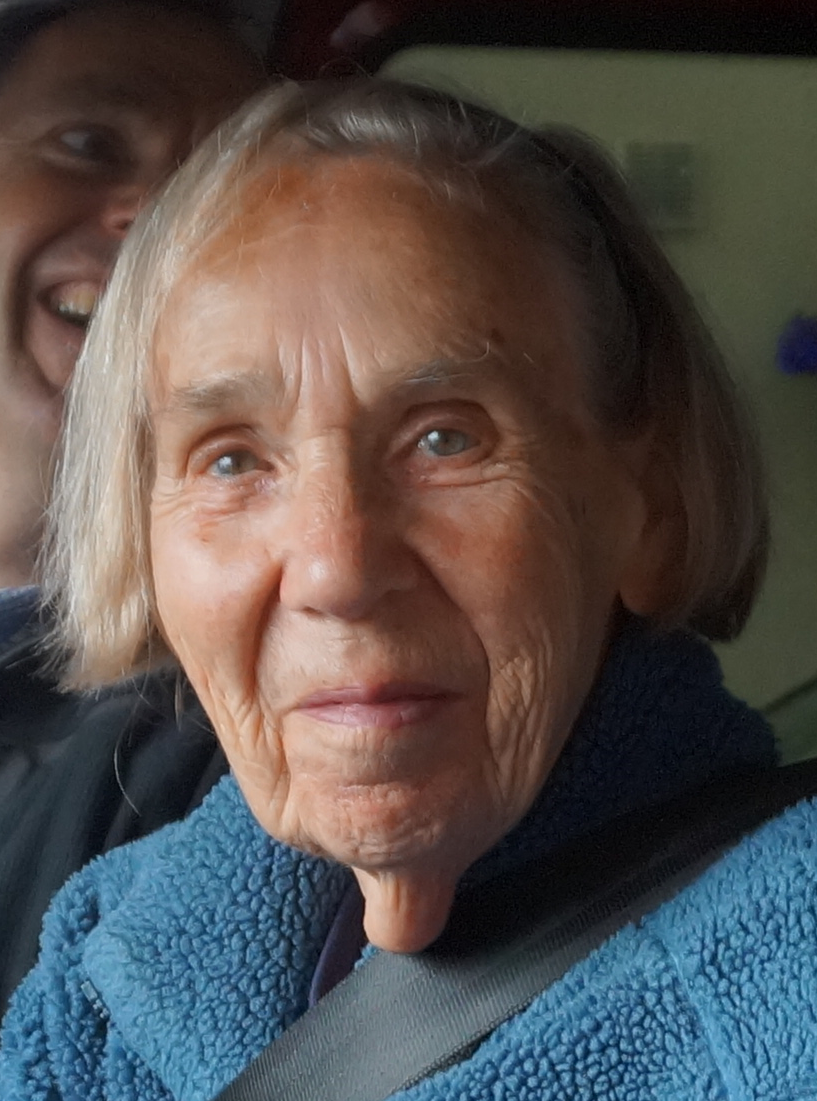
- Born: Mary Lee Woods; 12 March 1924; Hall Green, Birmingham, England
- Died: 29 November 2017 (aged 93); London, England
- Education: University of Birmingham
- Employers: Telecommunications Research Establishment; Mount Stromlo Observatory; Ferranti
- Spouse: Conway Berners-Lee (m. 1954)
- Children: Tim Berners-Lee; Peter; Helen; Mike Berners-Lee
- Parents: Bertie John Woods (father); Ida Frances Lee Burrows (mother)

Mary Lee Berners-Lee (née Woods; 12 March 1924 – 29 November 2017) was an English mathematician and computer scientist who worked in a team that developed programs for the Ferranti Mark 1 computer. She was the mother of Tim Berners-Lee, the inventor of the World Wide Web, and Mike Berners-Lee, an English researcher and writer on greenhouse gases.

== Early life and education ==
Woods was born on 12 March 1924, in Hall Green, Birmingham to Ida (née Burrows) and Bertie Woods. Both her parents were teachers. She had a brother who served in the Royal Air Force during World War II and was killed in action. She attended Yardley Grammar School in Yardley, Birmingham, where she developed an aptitude for mathematics. From 1942 to 1944, she took a wartime compressed two-year degree course in mathematics at the University of Birmingham. She then worked for the Telecommunications Research Establishment at Malvern until 1946 when she returned to take the third year of her degree. After completing her degree she was offered a fellowship by Richard van der Riet Woolley to work at Mount Stromlo Observatory in Canberra, Australia, from 1947 to 1951 when she joined Ferranti in Manchester as a computer programmer.

== Ferranti computer programming group ==
On joining the UK and electrical engineering and equipment firm, Ferranti, she started working in a group led by John Makepeace Bennett.

She worked on both the Ferranti Mark 1 and the Ferranti Mark 1 Star computers. The programs for these computers were written in machine code, and there was plenty of room for error because every bit had to be right. The machines used serial 40-bit arithmetic (with a double length accumulator), which meant that there were considerable difficulties in scaling the variables in the program to maintain adequate arithmetic precision.

The Ferranti programming team members found it useful to commit the following sequence of characters to memory, which represented the numbers 0–31 in the International Telegraph Alphabet No. 1, which was a 5-bit binary code of the paper tape that was used for input and output:

/E@A:SIU½DRJNFCKTZLWHYPQOBG"MXV£

Another difficulty of programming the Ferranti Mark 1 computers was the two-level storage of the computers. There were eight pages of Williams cathode ray tube (CRT) random access memory as the fast primary store, and 512 pages of the secondary store on a magnetic drum. Each page consisted of thirty-two 40-bit words, which appeared as sixty-four 20-bit lines on the CRTs. The programmer had to control all transfers between electronic and magnetic storage, and the transfers were slow and had to be reduced to a minimum. For programs dealing with large chunks of data, such as matrices, partitioning the data into page-sized chunks could be troublesome.

The Ferranti Mark 1 computer worked in integer arithmetic, and the engineers built the computer to display the lines of data on the CRTs with the most significant bit on the right due to their background in radar. This could be argued as the logically sensible choice, but was changed to the more conventional system of the most significant bit on the left for the Mark 1 Star. The Mark 1 Star worked with both fractions and integers. The Baudot teleprinter code was also abandoned for one that was in the following order:

ø£½0@:$ABCDEFGHIJKLMNPQRSTUVWXYZ

Program errors for the Ferranti Mark 1 computers were difficult to find. Programmers would sit at the computer control desk and watch the computer perform one instruction at a time in order to see where unintended events occurred. However, computer time became more and more valuable, so Dr Bennett suggested that Woods write a diagnostic program to print out the contents of the accumulator and particular store lines at specific points in the program so that error diagnosis could take place away from the computer. The challenge of her routine, 'Stopandprint', was that it had to monitor the program under diagnosis without interfering with it, and the limited space in the fast store made this difficult. Along with Bennet and Dr D.G. Prinz, Woods was involved in writing interpretive subroutines that were used by the Ferranti group.

Errors with the programs were one problem, but errors caused by the computer were another. The computer frequently misread the binary digits it was given. The engineers thought the mathematicians could compensate for this by programming arithmetic checks, and the mathematicians would too readily assume that a wrong program result was due to a computer error when it was due to a program error. This caused inevitable friction between the mathematicians and the engineers. At the centre of this was a program that Woods had written for inverting a matrix to solve 40 simultaneous equations, which was a large number for the time. The long rows of data required by this calculation took the computer too long to process without an error. For one dispute Woods went to Tom Kilburn, who was second only to Professor Sir Frederic Calland Williams in the engineering department. Kilburn was polite but did not argue, and she felt he was ignoring her complaint. However, 50 years later when she asked him about the exchange, he said that he had not argued "because [he] knew [she was] right."

While at Ferranti, Woods discovered that the women in her department were getting less pay than the men. She presented the case to the personnel department and was able to convince them to grant equal pay and rights for women.

== Cottage industry programming ==
Woods left Ferranti in 1955, when her first child was born. She continued to get involved in smaller programming projects, that she termed "cottage industry programming," so that she could complete jobs from home. Most notably she did some work with the London Transport Executive, to develop a simulation for bus routes that could prevent hold ups and bus bunching. She also developed a program for the RAF at Boscombe Down to track weather balloons and translate their readings. Then she came out of retirement in 1963 to work for a London-based company called K and H. While at K and H she wrote programming manuals until she retired in 1987.

== Personal life ==
On 10 July 1954 at St Saviour's Church, Hampstead, she married Conway Berners-Lee whom she met while working in the Ferranti team, and together they had four children; Timothy, Peter, Helen and Michael. Their eldest son, Tim Berners-Lee is the inventor of the World Wide Web, and their youngest son Mike Berners-Lee is an academic.

After a period devoted to bringing up children, she became a schoolteacher of mathematics, and then a programmer using BASIC, Fortran and other languages before retiring in 1987.

She died on 29 November 2017, aged 93.
