= World Wide Web Foundation =

Organization dedicated to the World Wide Web

- Formation: November 17, 2009; 17 years ago
- Founder: Tim Berners-Lee; Rosemary Leith
- Founded at: Washington, D.C.
- Defunct: September 27, 2024; 2 years ago
- Type: 501(c)(3), charitable organization
- Tax ID no.: 26-2852431
- Headquarters: Washington, D.C.
- Location(s): Washington, D.C., United States; London, England, United Kingdom; Jakarta, Indonesia
- Key people: Tim Berners-Lee (Founder); Tom Jenkins (Board Chair); Afsaneh Beschloss (Board Chair); José M. Alonso (CEO); Rosemary Leith (Founding Director)
- Website: webfoundation.org

The World Wide Web Foundation, also known as the Web Foundation, was a US-based international nonprofit organization advocating for a free and open web for everyone. It was cofounded by Tim Berners-Lee, the inventor of the World Wide Web, and Rosemary Leith. Announced in September 2008 in Washington, D.C., the Web Foundation launched operations in November 2009 at the Internet Governance Forum.

The Web Foundation aimed to expand global internet access and ensure the web is a safe, empowering platform for everyone to use freely and beneficially. One of its former board members was Gordon Brown, former prime minister of the United Kingdom.

On 27th September 2024, Tim Berners-Lee announced that the World Wide Web Foundation was shutting down, which was also announced on their home page.

== Mission ==
The Web Foundation's mission was to advance the open web as a public good and a basic right. It sought to achieve digital equality; a world where everyone has the same rights and opportunities online.

In an open letter published in March 2018, Web Foundation founder Berners-Lee called for action to connect the 50% of the world still not online and to ensure they find a web worth connecting to.

In 2019, Web Foundation launched the initiative Contract for the Web to attempt to address issues of political manipulation, fake news, privacy violations, and other malign forces on the internet.

== Organization ==
Headquartered in Washington, D.C., the Web Foundation worked across 70 countries, including work through partner organizations. Its team of around 30 employees worked from three main hubs in Jakarta, London and Washington, D.C.

It was also the host organization for the Alliance for Affordable Internet, a global coalition of organizations working to reduce the costs of broadband and increase access to the internet.

== Research ==
The Web Foundation produced a number of research products including the Open Data Barometer, the Affordability Report, the Web Index and other studies and reports.

== Campaigning ==
In November 2018, the Web Foundation launched the #ForTheWeb campaign, unveiled by founder Berners-Lee at the Web Summit tech conference in Lisbon, Portugal. The campaign calls on governments, companies and citizens to commit to defending a free and open web by signing up to a Contract for the Web.

The Contract for the Web was published as a set of initial high level principles that was built into a full contract published 25 November 2019. These principles received backing from governments including Germany and France, companies such as Google, Facebook and Cloudflare, as well as a number of civil society organizations.

== See also ==
- History of the World Wide Web
- World Wide Web Consortium
