= Lord Lieutenant of the West Midlands =

Civil post in West Midlands, England

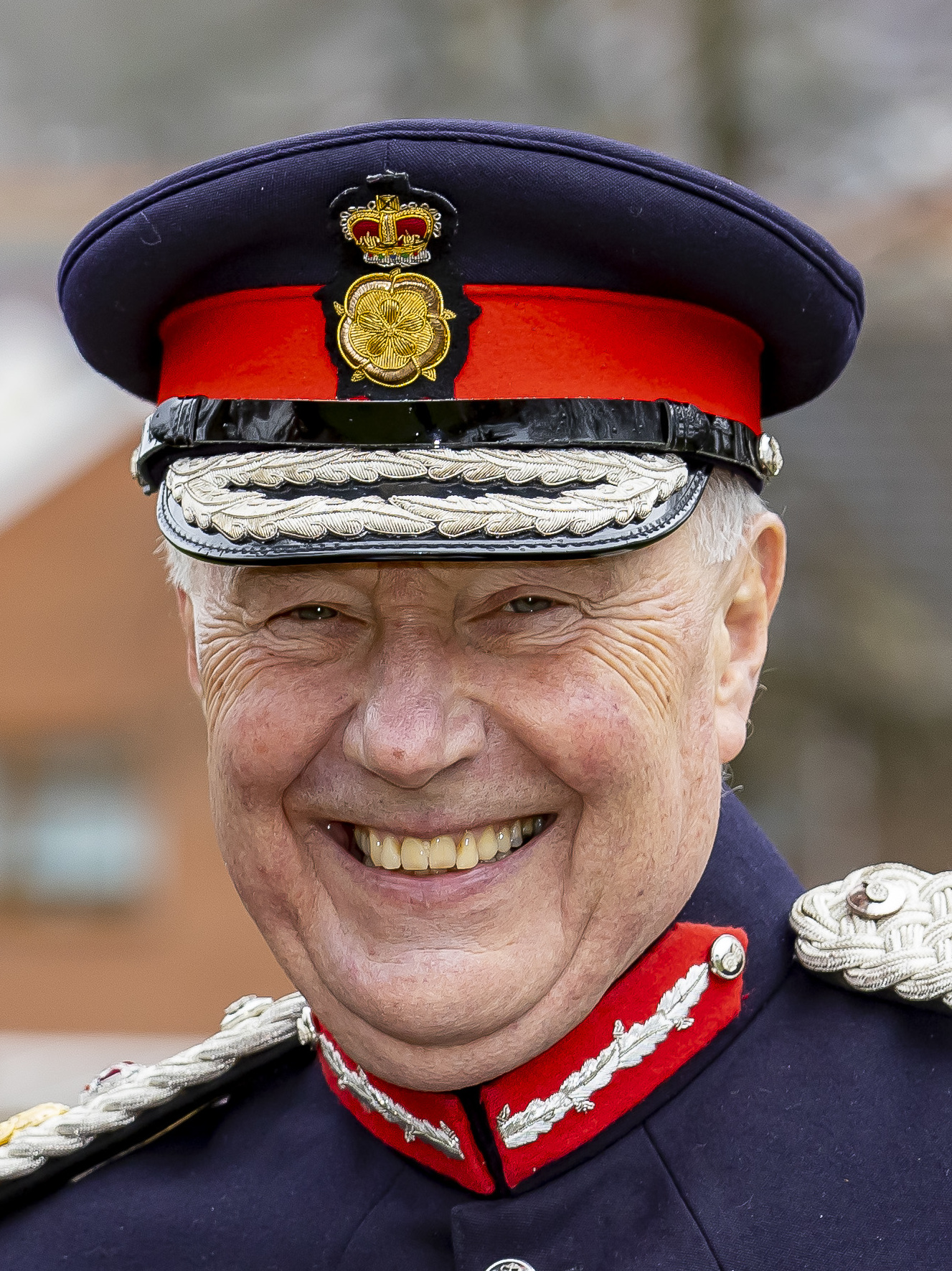
John Crabtree in the uniform of a Lord Lieutenant

This is a list of people who have served as Lord-Lieutenant of West Midlands since the creation of that office on 1 April 1974.

- Charles Ian Finch-Knightley, 11th Earl of Aylesford 1 April 1974 – 1993
- Sir Robert Richard Taylor 16 December 1993 – 2007
- Paul Sabapathy 2007–2015
- Sir John Crabtree 3 January 2017 – 5 August 2024
- Derrick Anderson 6 August 2024 – present
