= Robert Richard Taylor =

British public administrator, airport manager and Royal Air Force officer

- Born: 14 June 1932; Birmingham, England
- Died: 7 June 2008 (aged 75)
- Allegiance: United Kingdom
- Branch: Royal Air Force
- Service years: 1952-1972
- Rank: Flight lieutenant
- Commands: No 231 Operational Conversion Unit
- Conflicts: Mau Mau Uprising
- Alma mater: Yardley Grammar School

Sir Robert Richard Taylor, KCVO, OBE (1932–2008) was a British public administrator, airport manager and Royal Air Force officer.

Taylor was born on 14 June 1932 in Birmingham. After attending Yardley Grammar School, he joined the RAF in 1952 as a pilot, specialising in reconnaissance. He served in Egypt that year, and then in Kenya two years later (during the Mau Mau Uprising). In 1955, he became an instructor. And then spent spells in Canberra and Laarbruch until 1964, when he was posted in Singapore and promoted to Flight Lieutenant. After two years gathering intelligence in Borneo, he returned to Britain and then, in 1969, took command of No 231 Operational Conversion Unit in Canberra. He served there until 1972 and retired the following year, having been appointed a Member of the Order of the British Empire.

In 1974, Taylor became Assistant Director of Birmingham Airport, and was then its Director from 1974 to 1986 and its Managing Director from 1986 to 1994. During this period, he oversaw the airport's expansion, its transfer from direct municipal ownership, and the opening of its Eurohub terminal in 1991. He was promoted to Officer of the Order of the British Empire in 1989.

Taylor was appointed Lord Lieutenant of the West Midlands in 1993; and when he retired in 2006, he was appointed a Knight Commander of the Royal Victorian Order. He died on 7 June 2008.
