= This Is for Everyone =

2025 book by Tim Berners-Lee

- Author: Tim Berners-Lee with Stephen Witt
- Subject: History of World Wide Web
- Publisher: Macmillan
- Publication date: 9 September 2025
- ISBN: 9781035023677
- Published simultaneously in United States by Farrar, Straus and Giroux with the subtitle: The Unfinished Story of the World Wide Web (ISBN 9780374612467)

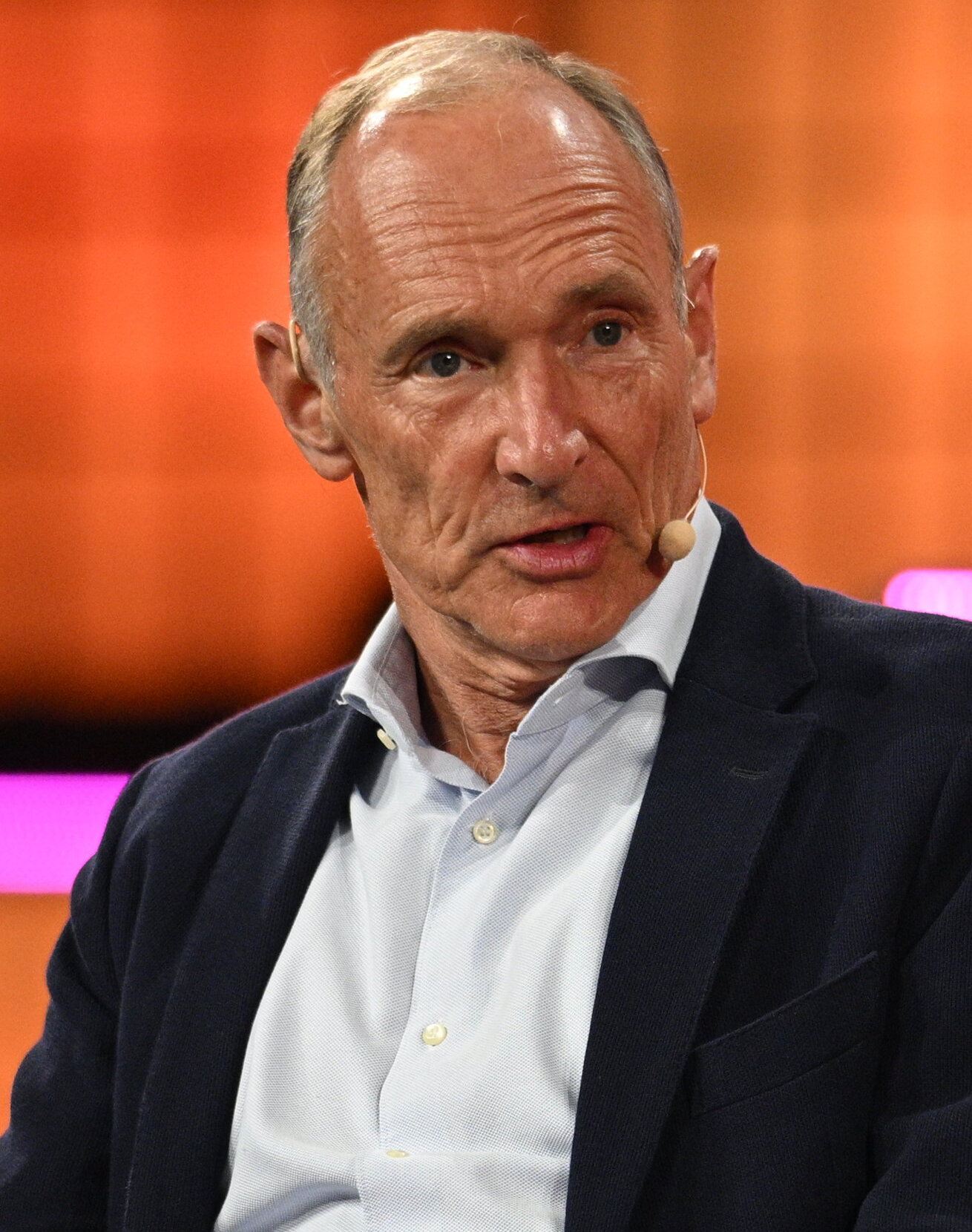
Berners-Lee in 2024

This Is for Everyone is a memoir by Tim Berners-Lee, the inventor of the World Wide Web, co-written by Stephen Witt and published in 2025. The United States edition has the added subtitle The Unfinished Story of the World Wide Web. It provides a first hand history of the invention and evolution of the World Wide Web, how the World Wide Web triggered a slew of other major changes, including the birth of e-commerce, browser wars, progression of search engines, dot-com bubble, the spread of social media, transition of the web from personal computers to mobile devices, and the emergence of AI. It also contains Berners-Lee's prescriptions for a better internet, especially on how people can reclaim control over their digital lives.

The first part of the book contains details about his childhood and upbringing in London, his student days including those at the University of Oxford and early career first at Plessey, a British electronic company and then at CERN.

The book was written with ghost-writer Stephen Witt.

The book was reviewed by John Arlidge in The Times of London September 24, 2025 in an article titled "Don’t panic, it’ll all be fine — Tim Berners-Lee on the future of the internet." with subtitle: "In his naively optimistic memoir, This Is for Everyone, the inventor of the internet offers hopey-changey platitudes."

Arlidge notes: "This Is for Everyone is a misnomer. This memoir-cum-history of the internet is only for those who are willing to struggle through 400 pages with no structure, no driving narrative, writing so bad it would shame ChatGPT, huge omissions and such naive optimism that by the end you want your money back. In the acknowledgments Berners-Lee pays tribute to his co-writer, Stephen Witt, [...]"
