= The Thinking Machine: Jensen Huang, Nvidia and the World's Most Coveted Microchip =

2025 biography by Stephen Witt

- Author: Stephen Witt
- ISBN: 978-0-593-83269-1

The Thinking Machine: Jensen Huang, Nvidia and the World's Most Coveted microchip is a biography of Nvidia CEO Jensen Huang, written by Stephen Witt. It was given Financial Times Business Book of the Year in 2025. It was also named a Best Book of 2025 by The Economist.

== Synopsis ==
The book covers Jensen Huang's childhood, where his parents sent him to America with his older brother, and accidentally placed them in a boarding school for troubled youths, to him becoming a champion of table tennis, starting Nvidia with two others, and its ups and downs. It also describes 30 years of the history of NVIDIA and considers the future of AI.

== Reception ==
The Guardian states "It's a great story and Witt tells it well."

Publishers Weekly calls it "insightful".

The NY Times' review says that the book "leaves us unsure of its subject's vision of the future, and Huang will probably never give a satisfying answer".
