= PlusNews =

Formally known as "IRIN/PlusNews," PlusNews is part of the United Nations Integrated Regional Information Network IRIN under the UN's Office for the Coordination of Humanitarian Affairs OCHA. Offering content free of charge to web sites and publications in order to increase awareness, the service is now one of the largest providers of original HIV and AIDS reporting.

== Origin and development ==
Today, 40 million people are living with HIV, and the pandemic is still spreading, a full quarter of a century after the virus was first identified. Despite the availability of drugs that can prolong people's lives, far too few have access to them. Although how to prevent infection is known, so many factors still stand in the way of stopping transmission. Launched in Johannesburg in 2001, PlusNews is an e-mail and internet-based service set up by the United Nations' Integrated Regional Information Networks (IRIN) to provide a one-stop platform for HIV and AIDS news and analysis, personal testimonies, photographs, country profiles and fact files, radio and film.

In 2004, PlusNews launched its French-language service based in Dakar, followed a year later by PlusNews Portuguese based out of Johannesburg. Today, as the organisation expands into Asia, the Middle East and Latin America, PlusNews articles are extensively reposted on electronic mailing lists, key news and advocacy websites, and regional newspapers.

As an organisation, PlusNews aims to support dialogue on HIV and AIDS, and promote knowledge, awareness and advocacy among decision-makers, the media and those directly affected by the epidemic.

== Audience and donors ==
PlusNews is a free email subscription and internet-based service. The major funders of the service are the United Kingdom's Department for International Development (DFID), the International Federation of Red Cross and Red Crescent Societies, the Open Society Initiative for Southern Africa, Sweden's Ministry for Foreign Affairs, and the Joint United Nations' programme on HIV and AIDS (UNAIDS).
