= Time 100: The Most Important People of the Century =

List of influential people of the 20th century

Time logo

Time 100: The Most Important People of the Century is a compilation of the 20th century's 100 most influential people, published in Time magazine across five issues in 1998 and 1999.

The idea for such a list started on February 1, 1998, with a debate at a symposium in Hanoi, Vietnam. The panel participants were former CBS Evening News anchor Dan Rather, historian Doris Kearns Goodwin, former New York governor Mario Cuomo, then–Stanford provost Condoleezza Rice, publisher Irving Kristol, and Time managing editor Walter Isaacson.

In a separate issue on December 31, 1999, Time recognized Albert Einstein as the Person of the Century.

== List categories ==
Time cited 20 selections in each of five categories: Leaders & Revolutionaries, Artists & Entertainers, Builders & Titans, Scientists & Thinkers, and Heroes & Icons.

== Person of the Century ==
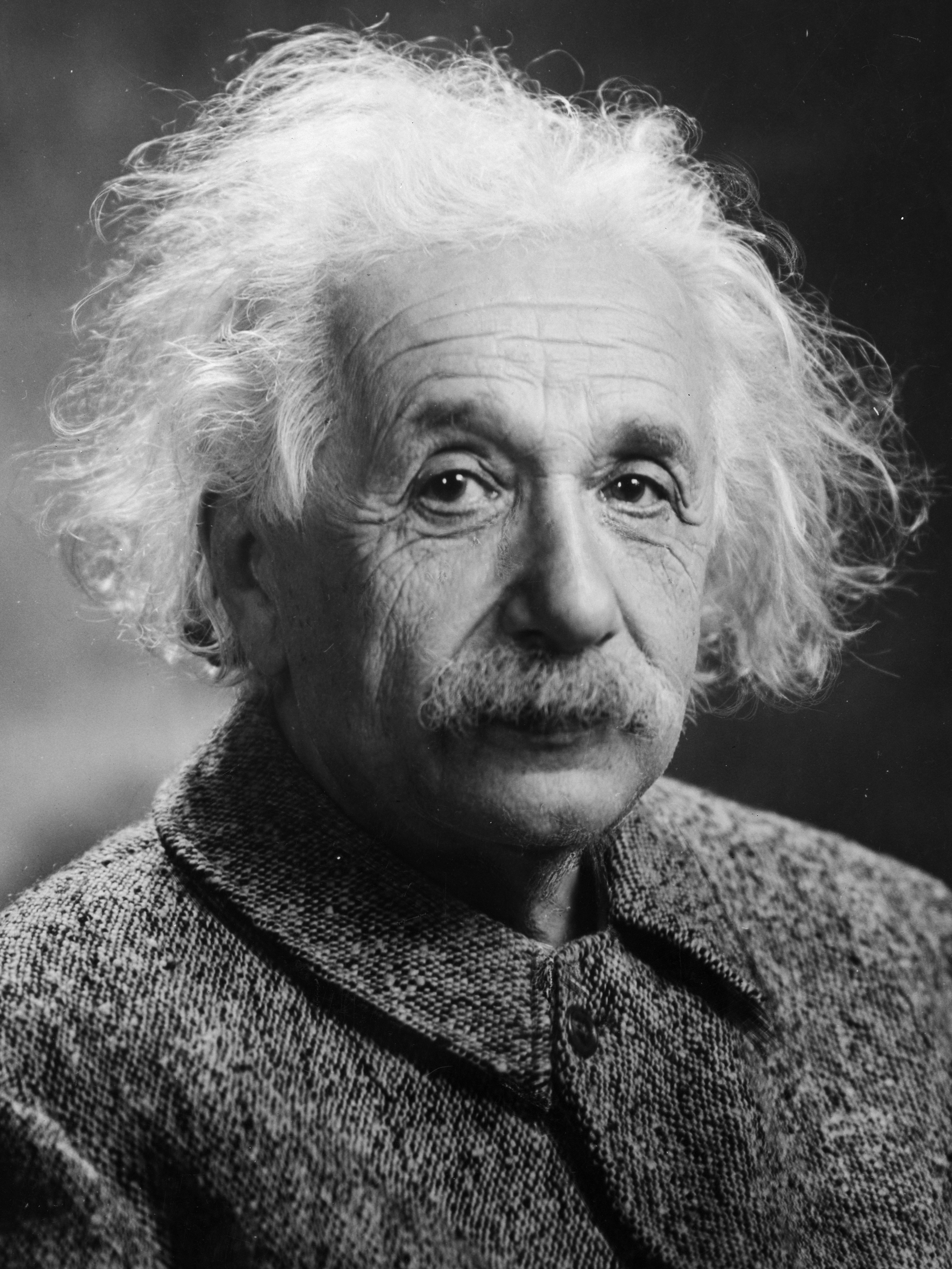
Albert Einstein

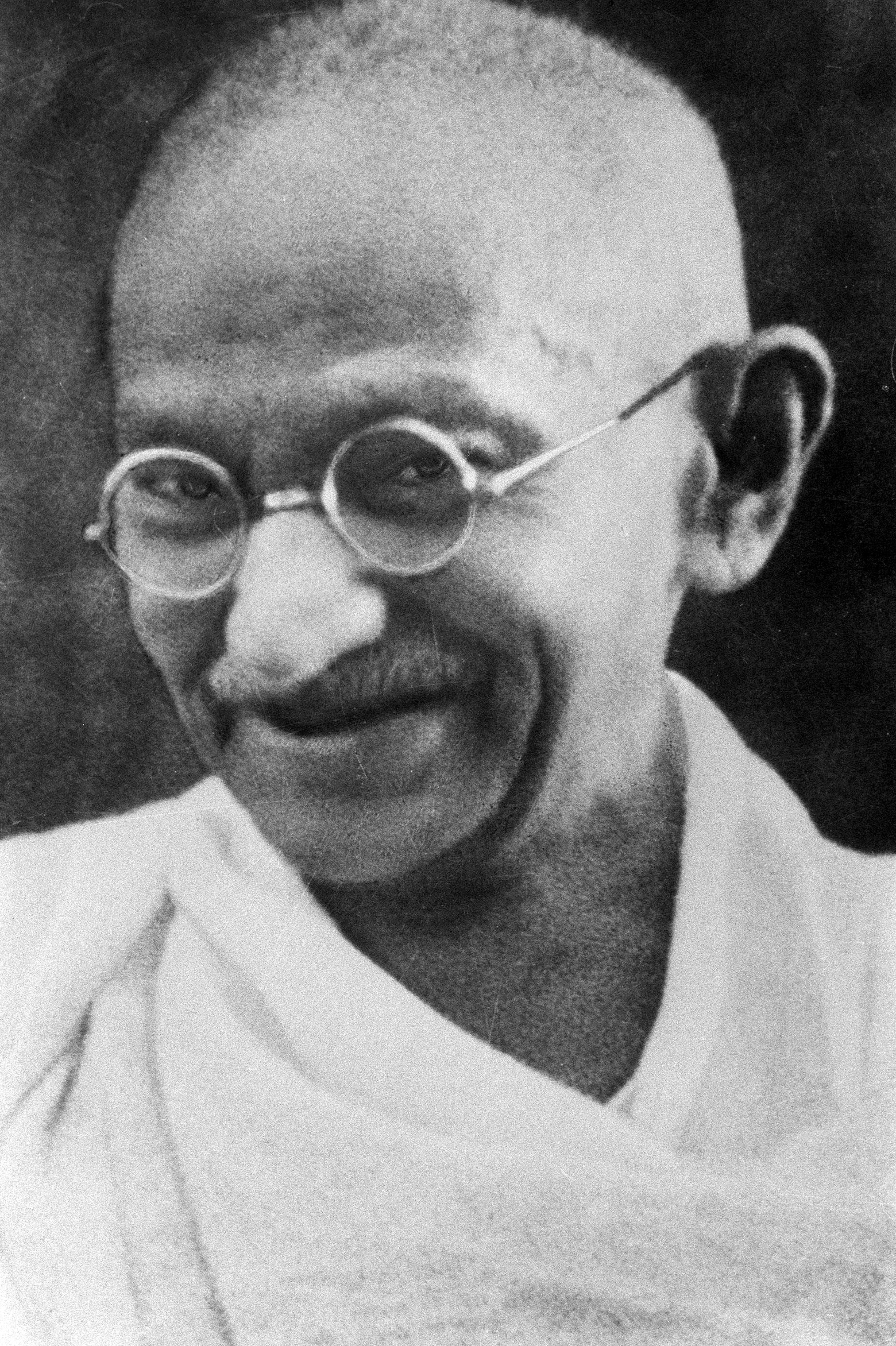
Mahatma Gandhi (runner-up)

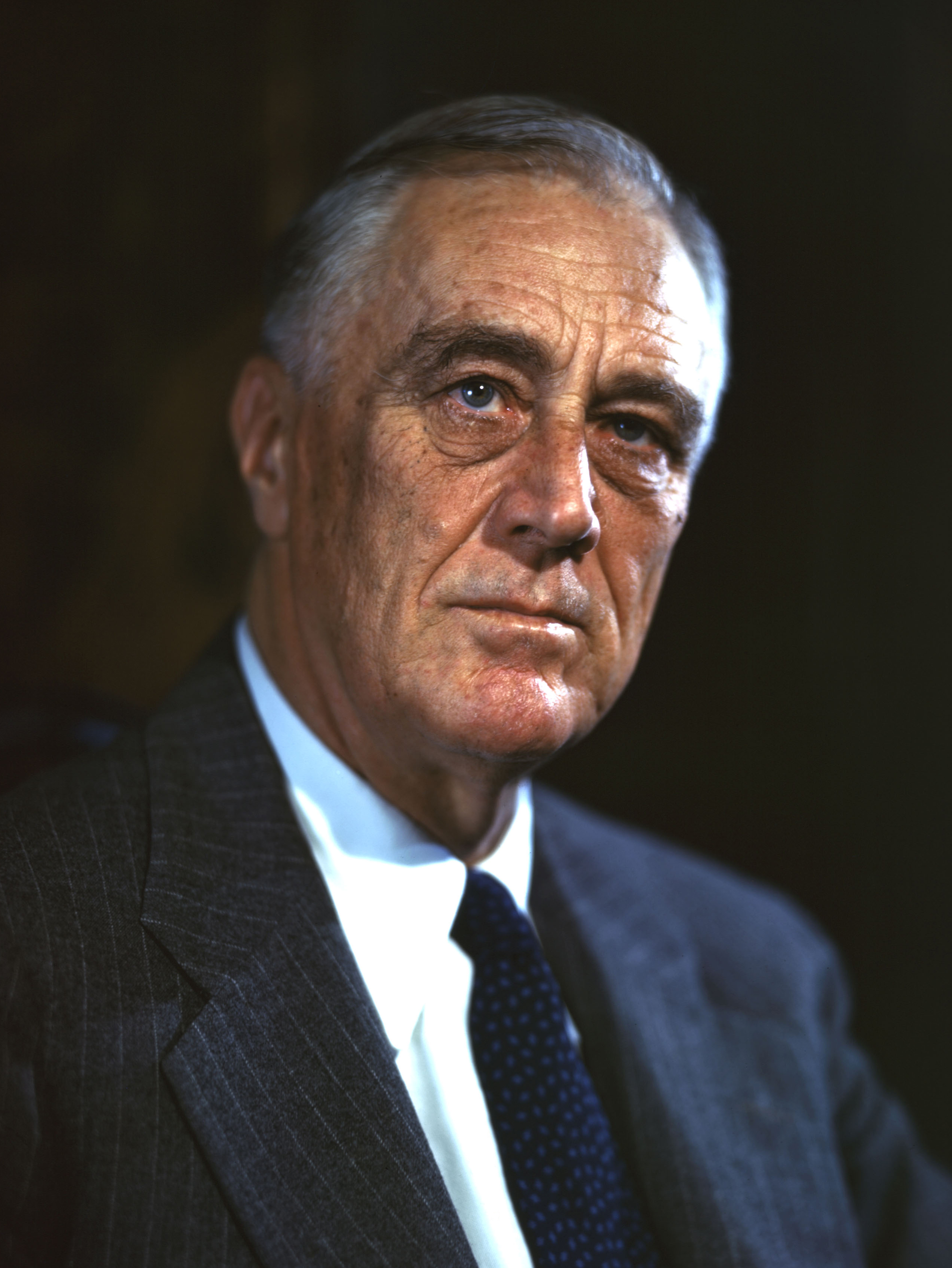
Franklin D. Roosevelt (runner-up)

Of the 100 chosen, Albert Einstein was chosen as the Person of the Century, on the grounds that he was the preeminent scientist in a century dominated by science. The editors of Time believed the 20th century "will be remembered foremost for its science and technology", and Einstein "serves as a symbol of all the scientists—such as Fermi, Heisenberg, Bohr, Richard Feynman, ...who built upon his work".

The cover of the magazine featured the famous image of Einstein taken in 1947 by American portrait photographer Philippe Halsman.

The runners-up were Mahatma Gandhi, an Indian independence activist, and Franklin D. Roosevelt, the 32nd president of the United States.

== Controversies ==
It was debated whether Adolf Hitler, responsible for World War II and the Holocaust, and Benito Mussolini for the Second Italo-Ethiopian War, should have been made Persons of the Century for their influence in politics.

The argument was based on Time's explicit criterion that the persons chosen should have the greatest impact on this century, for better or worse. In the same 31 December 1999 issue of Time, essayist Nancy Gibbs addressed the topic with the article The Necessary Evil? In the article, she argues that Hitler and Mussolini "were simply the latest in a long line of murderous figures, stretching back to before Genghis Khan. The only difference was technology: Both Hitler and Mussolini went about their cynical carnage with all the efficiency that modern industry had perfected" and present several rhetorical questions such as "Evil may be a powerful force, a seductive idea, but is it more powerful than genius, creativity, courage or generosity?".

== Criticisms ==
The list of the top 20 Artists and Entertainers, in particular, was criticized for not including Elvis Presley, a decision that Time magazine representative Bruce Handy initially defended in the following way:

One of the most important, innovative things about rock is the whole notion of songwriters singing their own works, of the immediacy of expression. Since Elvis didn't write his own material, unlike The Beatles or Bob Dylan or Robert Johnson, who's also someone who could have been included, maybe that cut against him… I think the Beatles pushed the envelope a lot further. Elvis' most original recordings were his first. The Beatles started out as imitators, then continued to grow throughout their years together.

Handy also defended Time's decision to include the fictional character Bart Simpson from The Simpsons television series among the 100 most influential people of the 20th century, and he did so as follows:

I don't see how you can look at this century and not include cartoons. They're one of our great contributions, along with jazz and film. (I know, I know. The movies were a 19th-century invention. But we 20th century folks really put them to good use.)… To some extent, too, we wanted people who also represented important 20th century trends or developments. That would help account for the Barts and Oprahs... What Bart, or really the Simpsons, have done is merge social satire with popular animation in a way that hasn't really been done before.

Early in the running, professional wrestler Ric Flair received over 300,000 votes in the online Man of the Century poll and nearly 900,000 votes were cast for Jesus; however, they were removed from the poll as Time.com officials stated that the votes for Flair and Jesus violated the "spirit" of the title.

The list also received criticism for its inclusion of Lucky Luciano, who was chosen in part because "he modernized the Mafia, shaping it into a smoothly run national crime syndicate focused on the bottom line". New York mayor Rudy Giuliani accused Time of "romanticizing" gangsters, and he stated: "The idea that he civilized the Mafia is absurd. He murdered in order to get the position that he had, and then he authorized hundreds and hundreds of murders." The selection was called an "outrage" by Philip Cannistraro, a Queens College professor of Italian-American studies, and Thomas Vitale, the New York State vice president of Fieri, an Italian-American charitable organization, criticized Time for "perpetuating myths" about Italian-Americans. However, Time business editor Bill Saporito defended the selection by describing Luciano as "kind of an evil genius" who had a deep impact on the underground economy. "We're not out there to heap glory on these people", he explained. "We're out to say these are people who influenced our lives". Saporito further noted that "every piece of merchandise that came out of the Garment District had a little extra cost in it because of organized crime".

== See also ==
- The Time 100. TIME magazine's list of the currently influential people, published annually beginning in 2004, following the success of 1999's "20th century" list.
