= Conway Berners-Lee =

English mathematician and computer scientist (1921–2019)

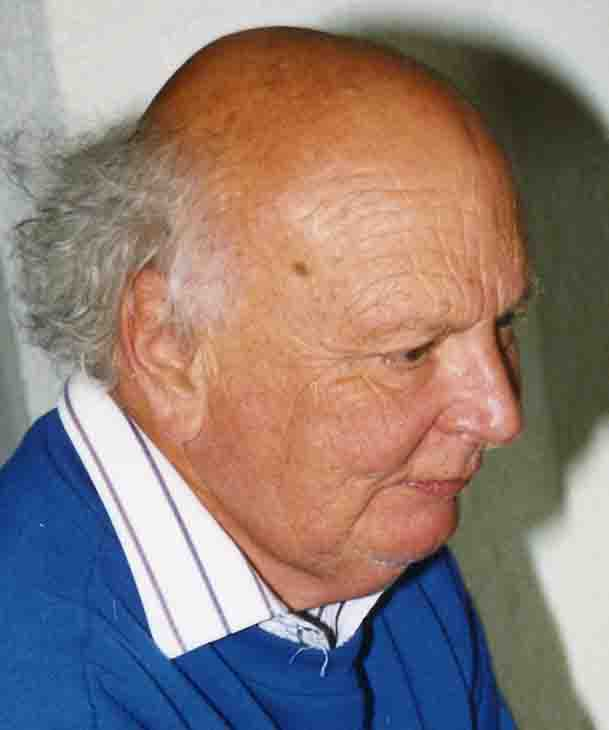
- Born: Conway Maurice Berners-Lee; 19 September 1921; Birmingham, England
- Died: 1 February 2019 (aged 97)
- Education: University of Cambridge
- Employers: National Physical Laboratory; Imperial Chemical Industries; Ferranti; International Computers and Tabulators; International Computers Limited
- Spouse: Mary Lee Woods (m. 1954; died 2017)
- Children: Tim Berners-Lee; Peter; Helen; Mike
- Parent(s): Helen Lane Campbell Gray and Cecil Burford Berners-Lee

Conway Maurice Berners-Lee (19 September 1921 – 1 February 2019) was an English mathematician and computer scientist who worked as a member of the team that developed the Ferranti Mark 1, the world's first commercial stored program electronic computer. He was born in Birmingham in 1921 and was the father of Tim Berners-Lee, the inventor of the World Wide Web, and Mike Berners-Lee, researcher into climate change.

== Education and early life ==
Berners-Lee was son of Major Cecil Burford Berners-Lee (1884–1931), of the Royal Field Artillery, and Helen Lane Campbell Gray (1895–1968). His mother was from Winnipeg, Manitoba, daughter of John Sidney Gray, M.D. His grandfather, Berners Burford Lee was married to Gertrude Payne Tegner, whose uncle (and her adopted father) was Alfred Tegner, originally from Helsingør (Elsinore) in Denmark. Early in World War II whilst an undergraduate at the University of Cambridge he read mathematics as a student at Trinity College, Cambridge. He volunteered for the armed services, but was instructed to stay on to take parts I and II of the mathematical tripos as a compressed two-year course, because the government needed people trained in mathematics and electronics. In addition, he attended a series of lectures in electronics.

== Career ==
After university, he had further training in electronic engineering and soon joined the army in the Corps of Royal Electrical and Mechanical Engineers (REME). He worked on Gun Laying and Searchlight Radar in England.

After the end of hostilities, Berners-Lee was posted to Egypt where he encountered Maurice Kendall's book The Advanced Theory of Statistics, which greatly impressed him. He then had a chance to join the statistics bureau in the GHQ in Cairo, known as the Number 1 Statistics Unit of the Royal Army Ordnance Corps. He was employed to close down a very large punched card installation involving about five million 65-column punched cards covering all types of vehicle and spares. This meant that they had to say goodbye to 30 women who had been punching the cards. The last job was sorting and listing the 250,000 personnel cards to get all the service people onto ships for home. There was a race with the clerks doing this job by hand—and the clerks won over the machines.

Berners-Lee was demobilised in 1947 with the rank of Major. He then worked on a punched card data processing system for the Plastics Division of Imperial Chemical Industries (ICI). He met his wife Mary Lee Woods at the Ferranti Christmas party in Manchester in 1952. She had been working as a programmer on the Ferranti Mark 1 and Mark 1 Star computers at the Department of Computer Science, University of Manchester since 1951. He joined Ferranti in 1953 working at Ferranti's London Computer Centre. They were married on 10 July 1954 at St Saviour's Church, Hampstead.

The following is an extract from Dominic Wilson's book Organizational Marketing.

In Manchester, nearly half the programmers were women, Conway Berners-Lee, who married one of them, said 'Ferranti hired intelligent girls very cheaply but this gave them a big cultural problem because, prior to that, the company had only employed women as typists or factory hands'. 'Men got more than women', Mary Lee added. 'It was grossly unfair and there was a rebellion. The personnel officer was shocked we'd even discussed our wages.' She was on £400 a year. [Her starting salary was actually £450.] 'The Tin Hut [where the programmers worked] marriage rate was high', her husband said. 'The Robinsons … the Bennetts … the Clarkes … us.' [ ... ] Many of these pioneers had moved on to professorships, or stock options and top executive jobs. They'd been the culmination of a measured progress from military radar work to academia to commerce, and the heroically named 'Pegasus’ computers had made Ferranti a lot of money.

In the 1950s it was not clear how computers could usefully be employed away from the field of mathematics. As well as statistics, Berners-Lee had acquired a knowledge of operations research (OR), and he showed himself to be good at devising worthwhile computer applications. He directed the development of routines for the basic data processing techniques of sorting and updating files. In 1956 he devised an application for planning the production of items from a variety of components, for example, animal feed products. In 1957 he published an article on machine loading. A report that he produced in 1964 listed 31 Ferranti projects that used OR techniques in a wide variety of businesses.

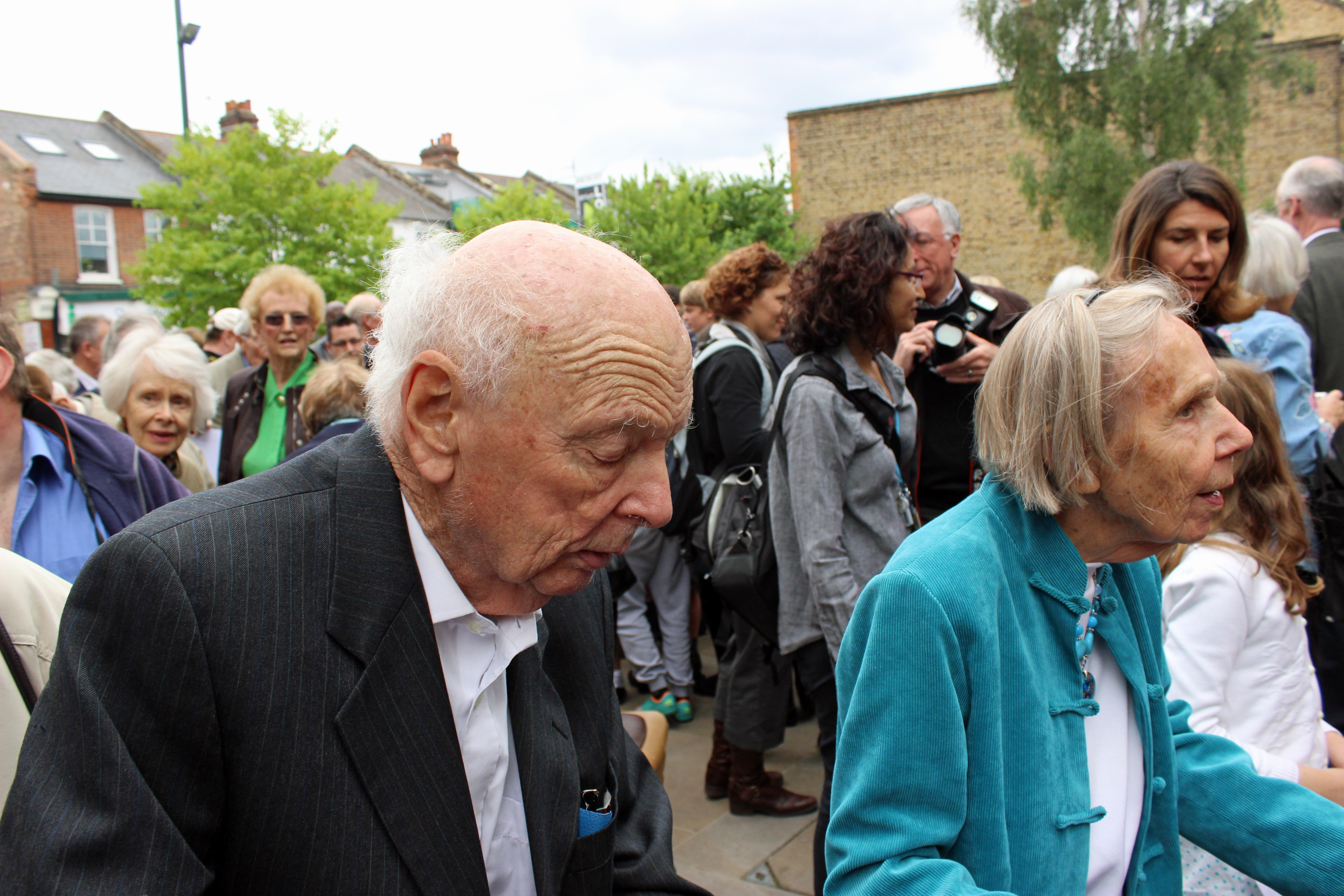
Conway Berners-Lee and Mary Lee Berners-Lee in 2013

The business computing division of Ferranti was merged with International Computers and Tabulators (ICT) in 1963, and ICT was, in turn, merged with English Electric Leo Marconi (EELM) computers in 1968 to form International Computers Limited (ICL).

In 1960 Berners-Lee had evolved a technique for editing text—including hyphenation—for metal typesetting of printed material. As space in memory and backing store was a scarce and valuable resource in those days, he had also devised a procedure for compressing text, which in 1963 he sent to Bob Bemer at Univac.

In the late 1960s Berners-Lee led the Medical Development Team of ICT and then ICL. He was involved in some of the earliest developments in the applications of computers in medicine, and his text compression ideas were taken up by an early electronic patient record system.

Berners-Lee spent the 1970s developing and using a queuing network model for ICL's 'New Range' of computers (later the ICL 2900 Series) with Dr John Pinkerton who was responsible for optimising the price/performance of the new systems. It was known as FAST – standing for Football Analogy for System Throughput. The work done by each 'player' was derived from a system monitor file containing data for device and concurrency counts. He received much encouragement when Hughes and Moe at Norwegian University of Science and Technology, Trondheim, predicted the effect of increasing the memory on their Univac Installation. The model could also be used to predict throughput on a minute to minute basis – peaks being believed to be due to instability in the operating system. He retired in 1986.

== Death ==
Berners-Lee died on 1 February 2019 at the age of 97.
