= List of web directories =

A web directory is a listing of websites organized in a hierarchy or interconnected list of categories.

The following is a list of notable web directory services.

== General ==
- DOAJ.org – Directory of Open Access Journals
- Curlie.org (formerly DMOZ, also known as Open Directory Project – the largest directory of the Web). Its open content has been mirrored at many sites. The original DMOZ went offline in March 2017, but continued since August 2018 as Curlie.
- Jasmine Directory - Lists websites by topic and by region, specializing in business websites.
- Sources – Web portal for journalists, freelance writers, editors, authors, and researchers; in addition to a search engine it includes a subject-based directory.

== Business directories ==
- Business.com – Integrated directory of knowledge resources and companies, that charges a fee for listing review and operates as a pay per click search engine.
- Yell – is a digital marketing and online directory business in the United Kingdom

== Niche ==
- Library and Archival Exhibitions on the Web – international database of online exhibitions which is a service of the Smithsonian Institution Libraries.
- Virtual Library museums pages – directory of museum websites around the world.

== Regional ==
- 2345.com – Chinese web directory founded in 2005. The website is the second most used web directory in China.
- Alleba – Filipino search engine website, with directory.
- Timway – web portal and directory primarily serving Hong Kong.

== Defunct directories ==
- AboutUs.com – directory from 2005 to 2013.
- Anime Web Turnpike – was a web directory founded in August 1995 by Jay Fubler Harvey. It served as a large database of links to various anime and manga websites.
- Biographicon – directory of biographical entries.
- Dalilmasr – Egyptian online directory
- Google Directory – copy of DMOZ directory, with sites listed in PageRank order within each category. Closed in July 2011.
- Internet Public Library – librarian-edited directory, product of a merger with the Librarians' Internet Index (LII) in 2010. Closed in June 2015.
- Intute – directory of websites for study and research. Maintenance stopped in July 2011, archives remain available.
- LookSmart – operated several vertical directories from 1995 to 2006.
- Lycos' TOP 5% – from 1995 until 2000 it aimed to list the Web's top 5% of Websites.
- ProgrammableWeb – resource on APIs that provides a directory of APIs.
- World Wide Web Virtual Library (VLIB) – Was the first directory of the Web, and operated from 1991 to 2005.
- Yahoo Directory– first service that Yahoo! offered. Closed in December 2014.
- Yahoo Kids – oldest online search directory for children, until its discontinuation as of April 30, 2013.
- Zeal – volunteer-built Web directory; it was introduced in 1999, acquired by LookSmart in 2000, and shut down in 2006.

== See also ==
- List of search engines
- Web directory
