= Exhibition =

Organized presentation and display of a selection of items

Exhibitions
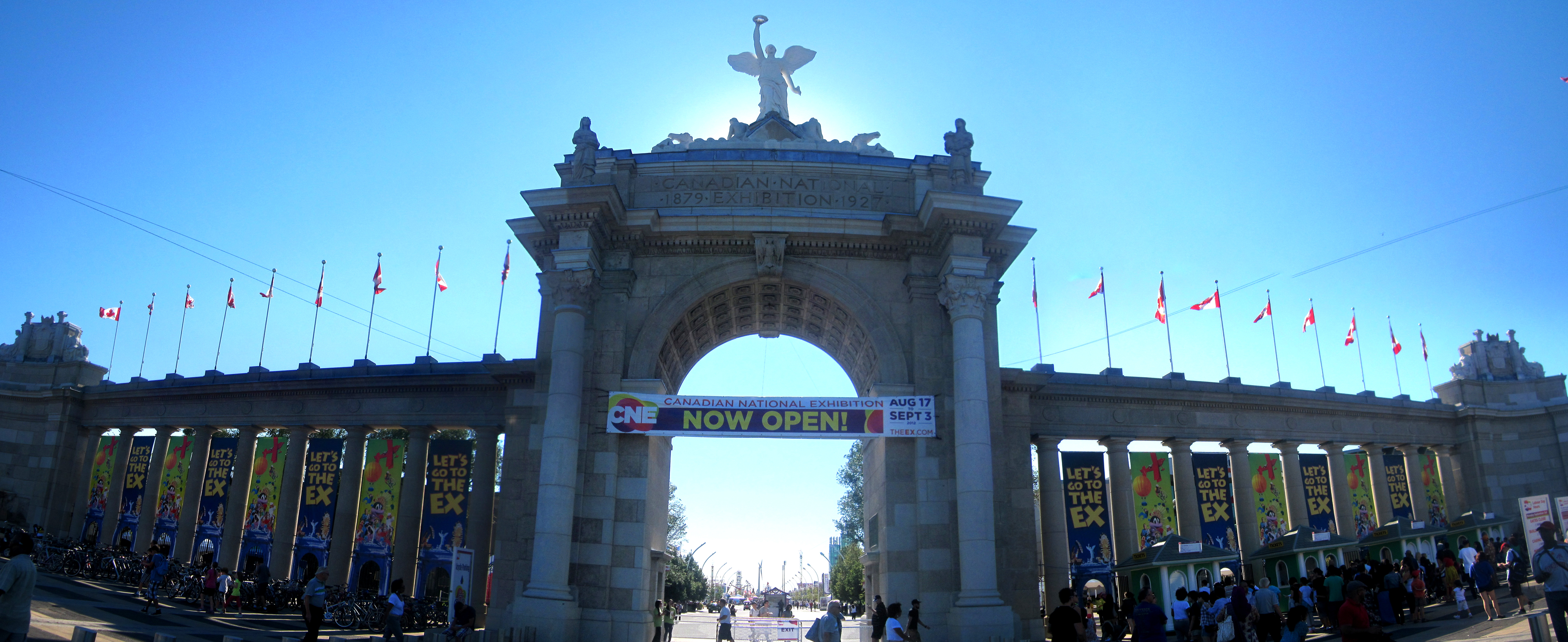
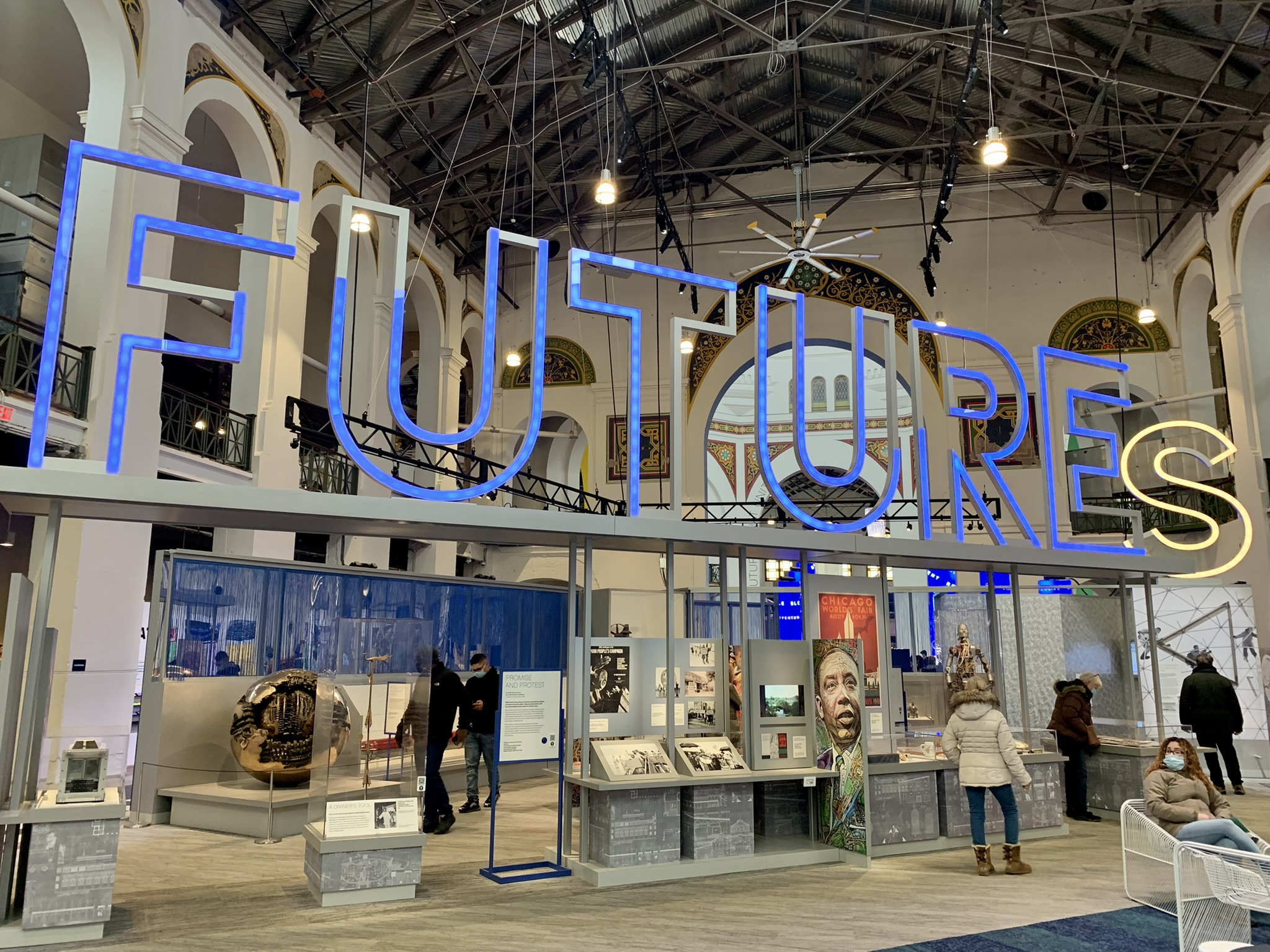
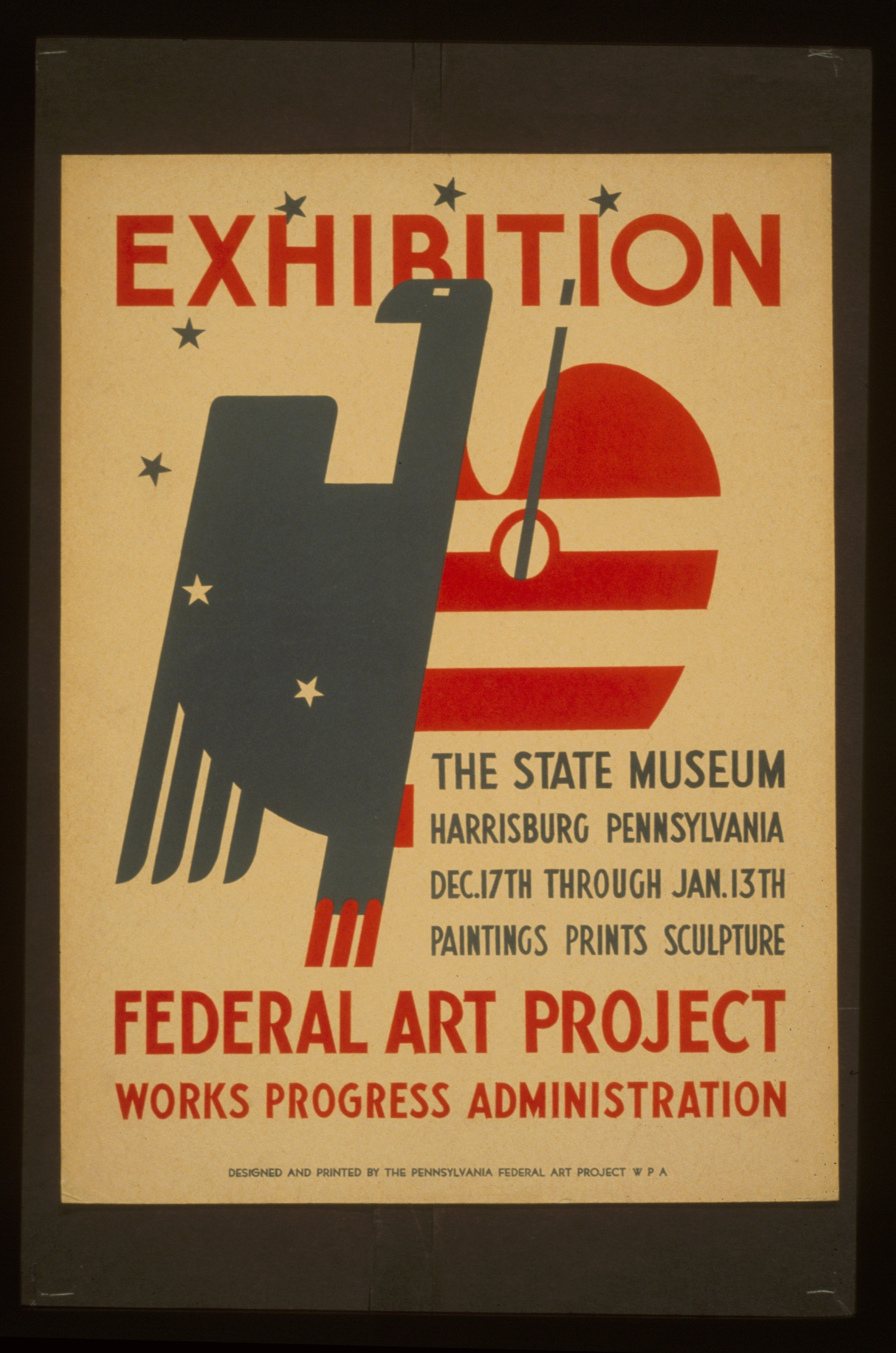
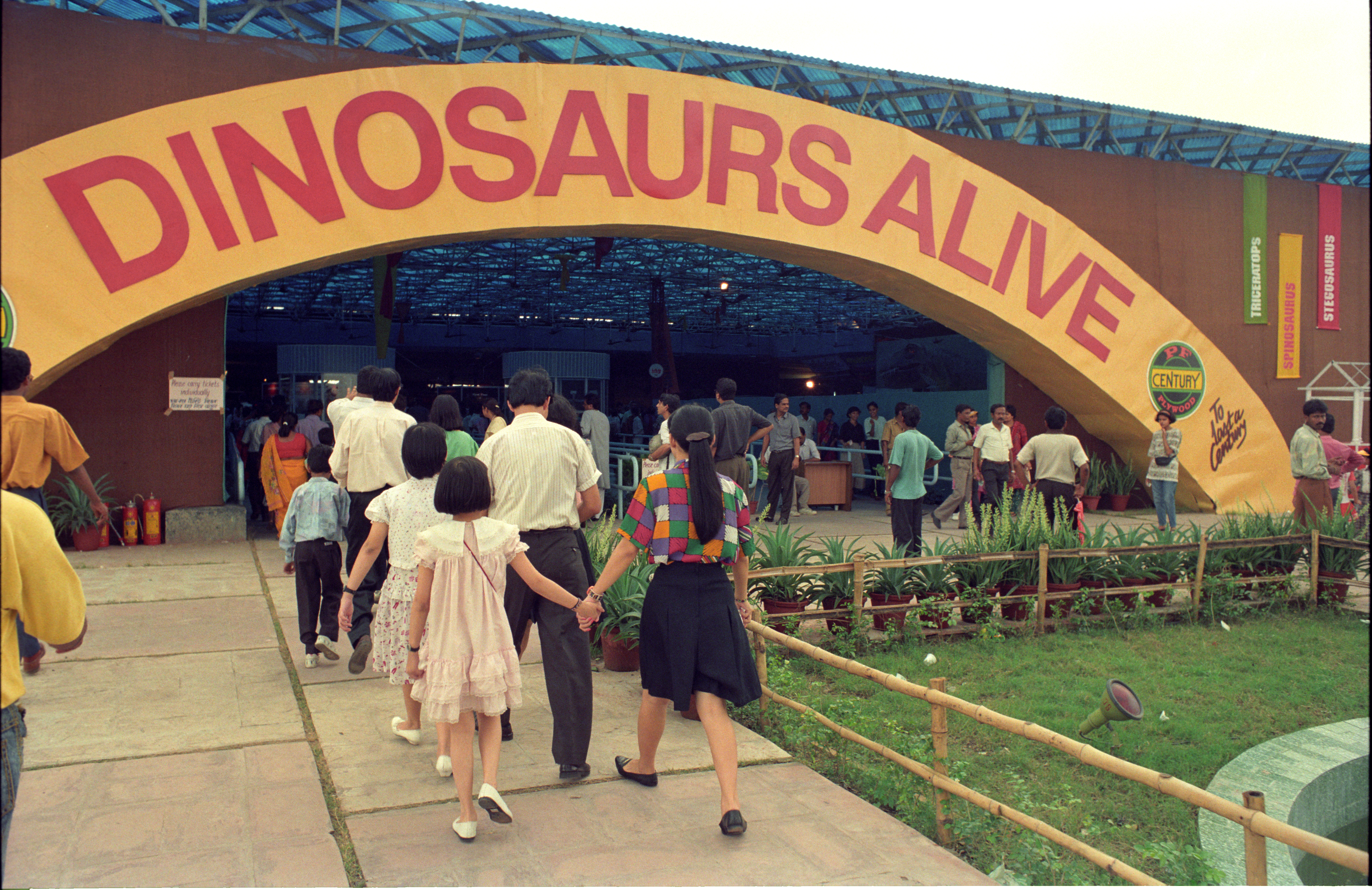
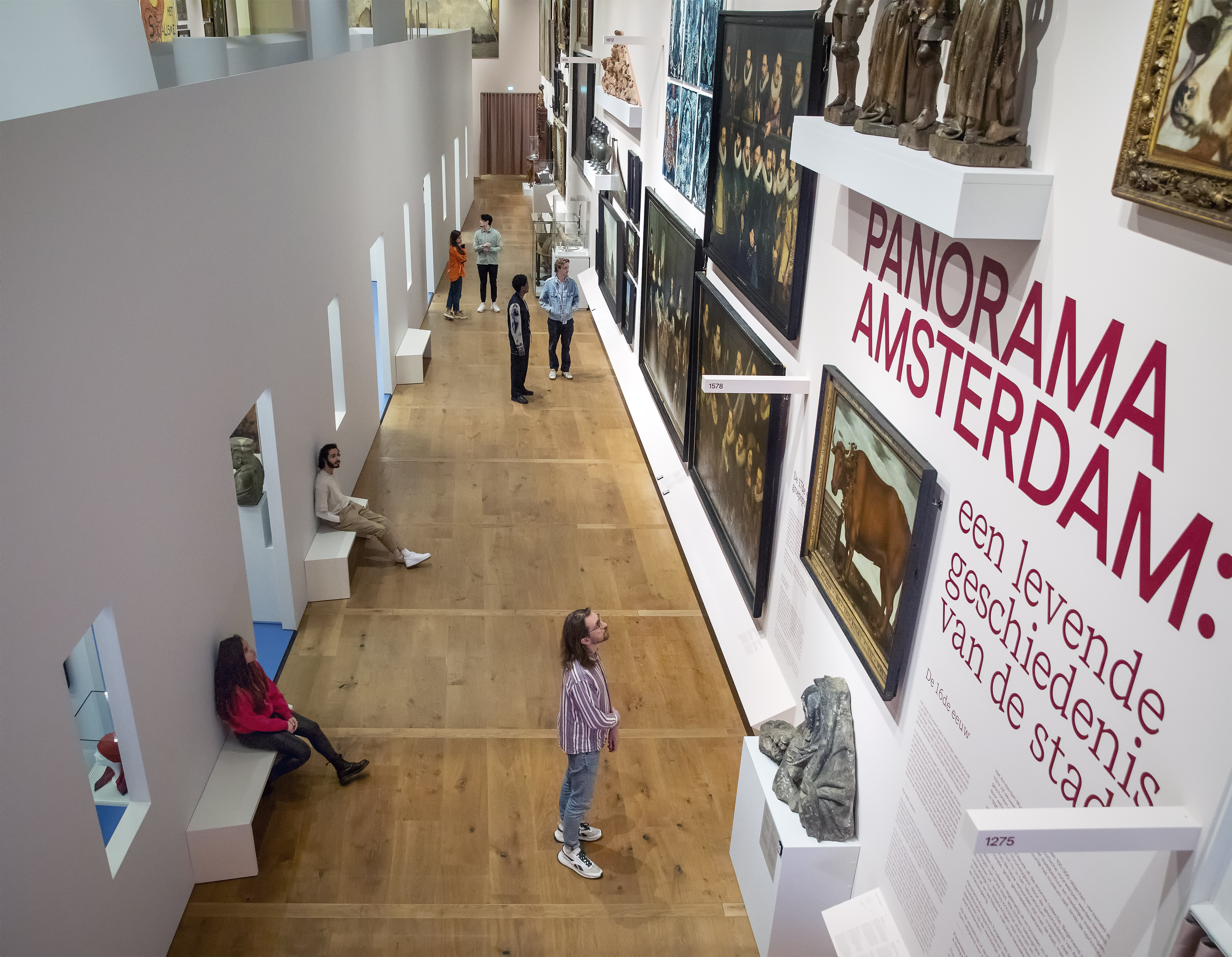
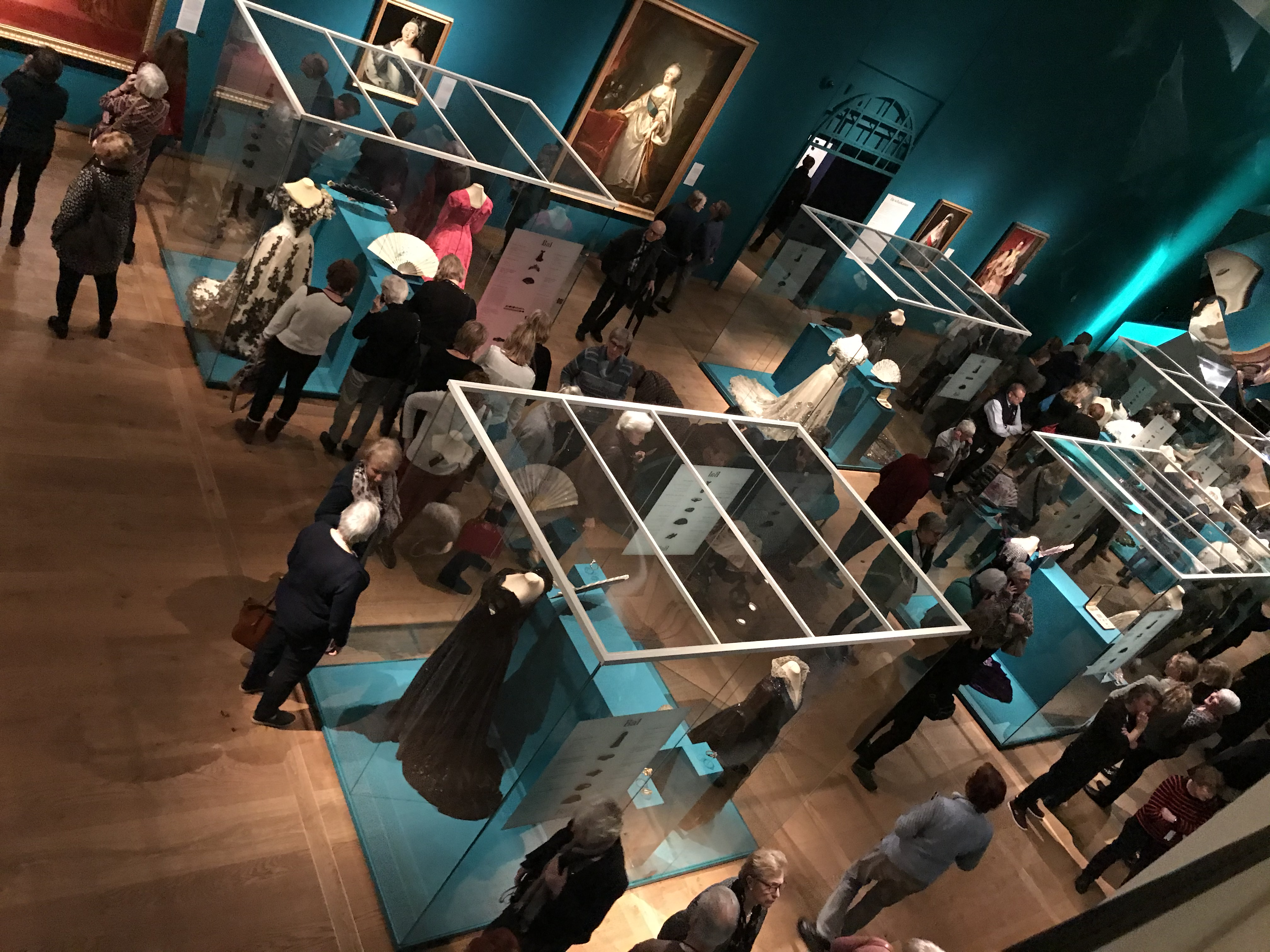
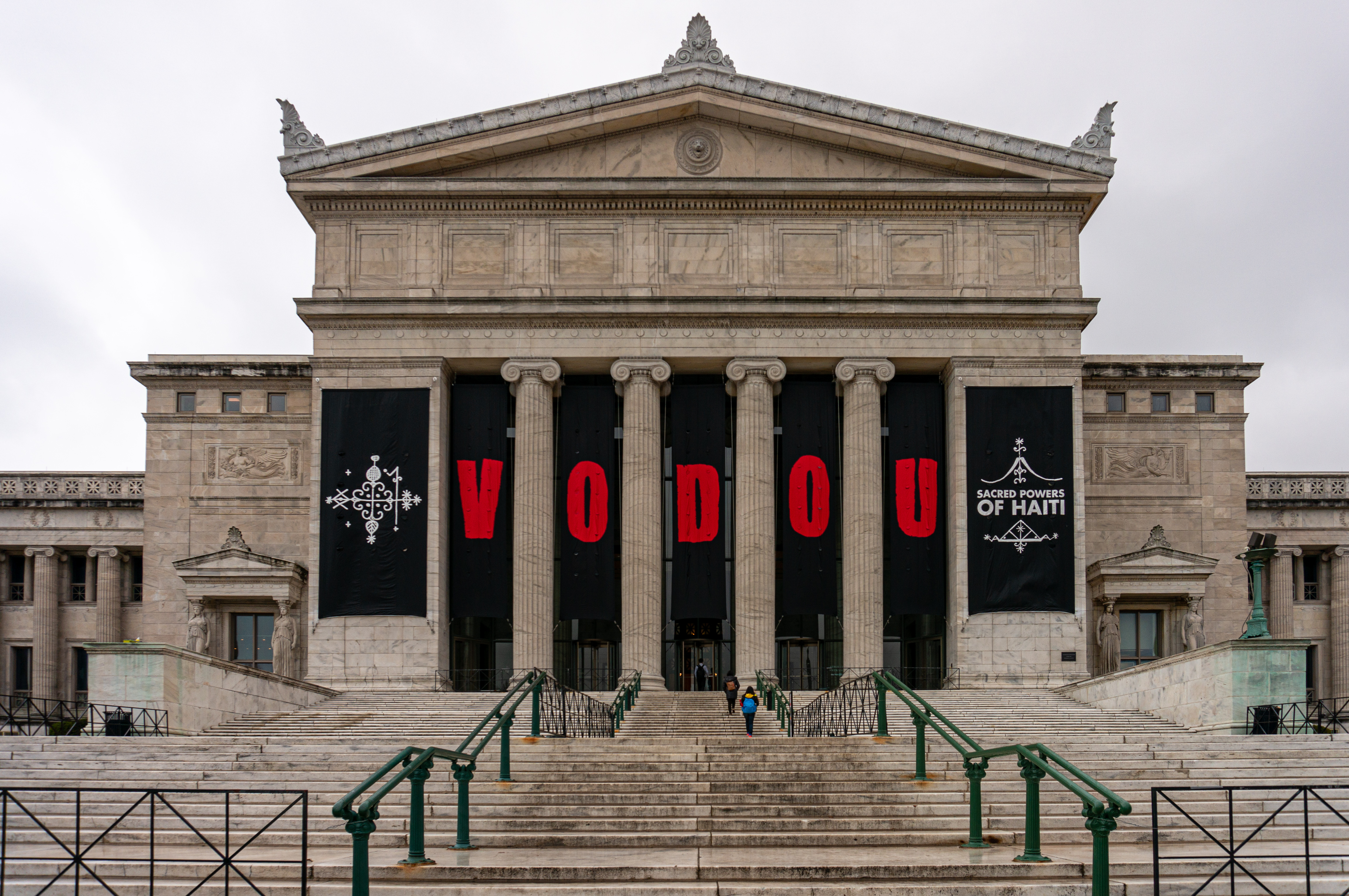

An exhibition, in the most general sense, is an organized presentation and display of a selection of items. In practice, exhibitions usually occur within a cultural or educational setting such as a museum, art gallery, park, library, exhibition hall, or World's fairs. Exhibitions can include many things such as art in both major museums and smaller galleries, interpretive exhibitions, natural history museums and history museums, and also varieties such as more commercially focused exhibitions and trade fairs. They can also foster community engagement, dialogue, and education, providing visitors with opportunities to explore diverse perspectives, historical contexts, and contemporary issues. Additionally, exhibitions frequently contribute to the promotion of artists, innovators, and industries, acting as a conduit for the exchange of ideas and the celebration of human creativity and achievement.

In British English the word "exhibition" is used for a collection of items placed on display and the event as a whole, which in American English is usually an "exhibit". In both varieties of English each object being shown within an exhibition is an "exhibit". In common usage, "exhibitions" are considered temporary and usually scheduled to open and close on specific dates. While many exhibitions are shown in just one venue, some exhibitions are shown in multiple locations and are called traveling exhibitions, and some are online exhibitions. Exhibitions featuring especially fragile or valuable objects, or live animals—may be shown only during a formal presentation, under the close supervision of attendant or educator. Temporary exhibits that are transported from institution to institution are traveling exhibits.

Though exhibitions are common events, the concept of an exhibition is quite wide and encompasses many variables. Exhibitions range from an extraordinarily large event such as a World's fair exposition to small one-artist solo shows or a display of just one item. Often a team of specialists is required to assemble and execute an exhibition; these specialists vary depending on the type of said exhibit. Curators are sometimes involved as the people who select the items in an exhibition. Writers and editors are sometimes needed to write text, labels and accompanying printed material such as catalogs and books. Architects, exhibition designers, graphic designers and other designers may be needed to shape the exhibition space and give form to the editorial content. Organizing and holding exhibitions also requires effective event planning, management, and logistics.

== History ==
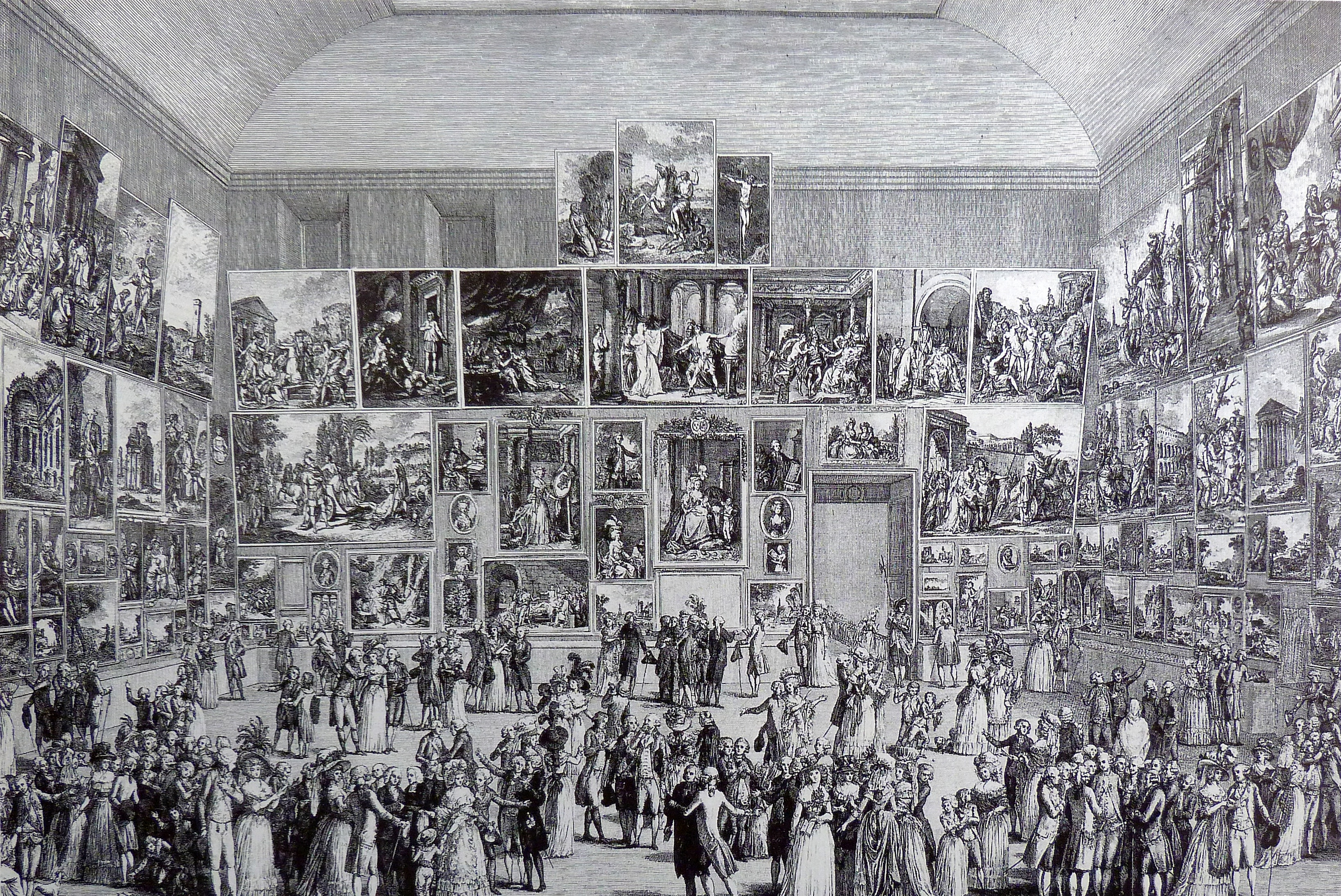
The Paris Salon of 1787, held at the Louvre

The exhibition came fully into its own in the 19th century, but various temporary exhibitions had been held before that, especially the regular displays of mostly new art in major cities. The Paris Salon of the Académie des Beaux-Arts was the most famous of these, beginning in 1667, and open to the public from 1737. By the mid-18th century this and its equivalents in other countries had become crucial for developing and maintaining the reputation of contemporary artists. In London the Royal Academy Summer Exhibition has been held annually since 1769, and the British Institution ran temporary exhibitions from 1805 to 1867, typically twice a year, with one of new British painting and one of loans of old masters from the Royal Collection and the aristocratic collections of English country houses.

By the mid-19th century many of the new national museums of Europe were in place, and holding exhibitions of their own collections, or loaned collections, or a mixture of objects from both sourcers, which remains a typical mix today. The "Chronology of Temporary Exhibitions at the British Museum" goes back to 1838.

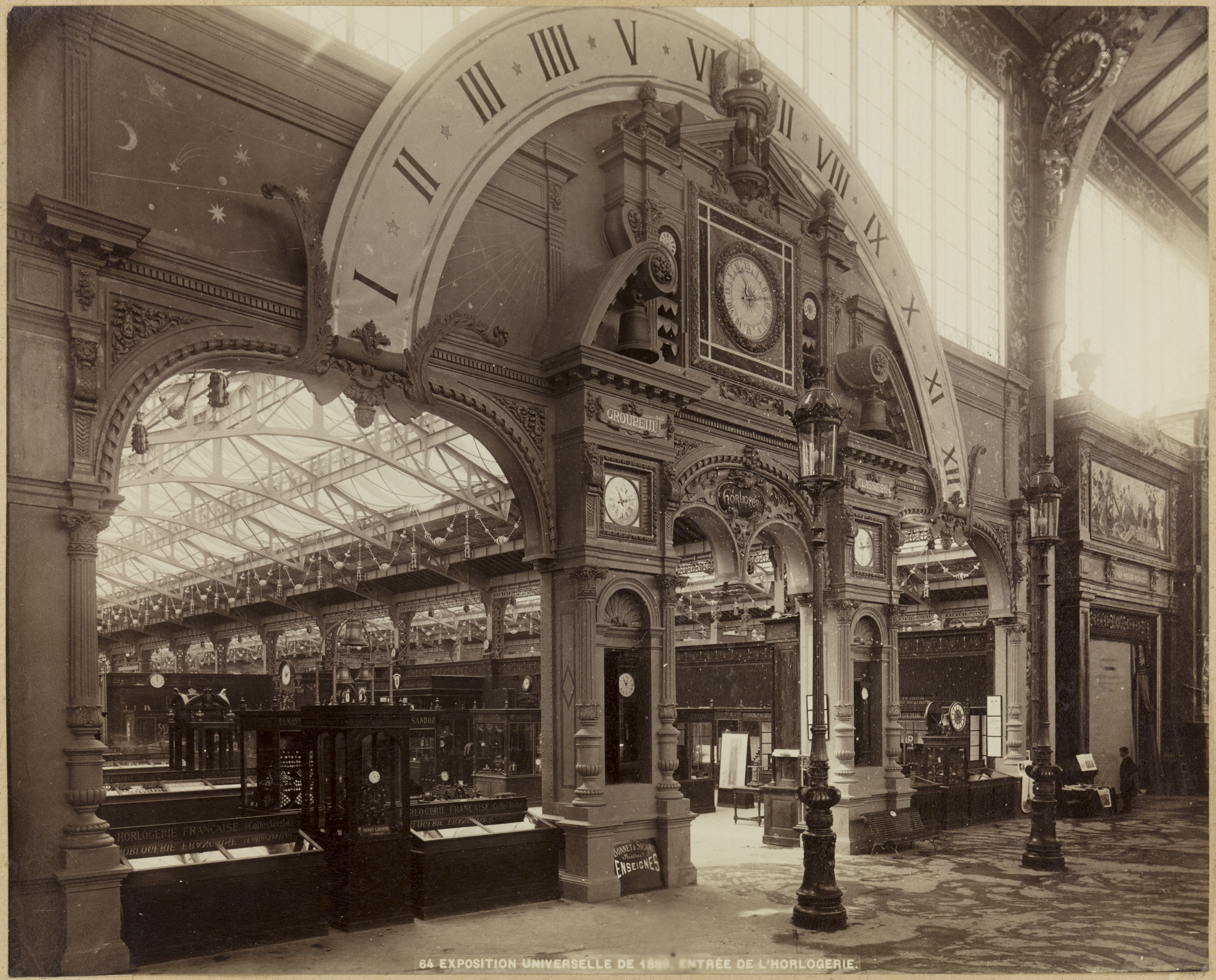
Entrance to Horology Exhibition. Paris World Exhibition, 1889

The tradition of the Universal exposition "world Expo" or "World's Fair" began with the Great Exhibition of 1851 in London; these are only held every few years. The Eiffel Tower in Paris was built for the Exposition Universelle (1889) and served as an entrance arch.

Modern exhibitions may be concerned with preservation, education and demonstration, early exhibitions were designed to attract public interest and curiosity. Before the widespread adoption of photography, the exhibition of a single object could attract large crowds. Visitors might even be overcome with Stendhal syndrome, feeling dizzy or overwhelmed by the intense sensory experience of an exhibit. Today, there is still tension between the design of exhibits for educational purposes or for the purpose of attracting and entertaining an audience, as a tourist attraction.

== Art exhibitions ==
Art exhibitions include an array of artifacts from countless forms of human making: paintings, drawings, crafts, sculpture, video installations, sound installations, performances, interactive art. Art exhibitions may focus on one artist, one group, one genre, one theme or one collection; or may be organized by curators, selected by juries, or show any artwork submitted.

Fine arts exhibitions typically highlight works of art with generous space and lighting, supplying information through labels or audioguides designed to be unobtrusive to the art itself.

Variations of exhibitions may reoccur on a cycle every few years, as in the case with Biennales, triennials and quadrennials. The first art exhibition to be called a blockbuster was allegedly the 1960 Picasso show at Tate in London.

== Interpretive exhibitions ==
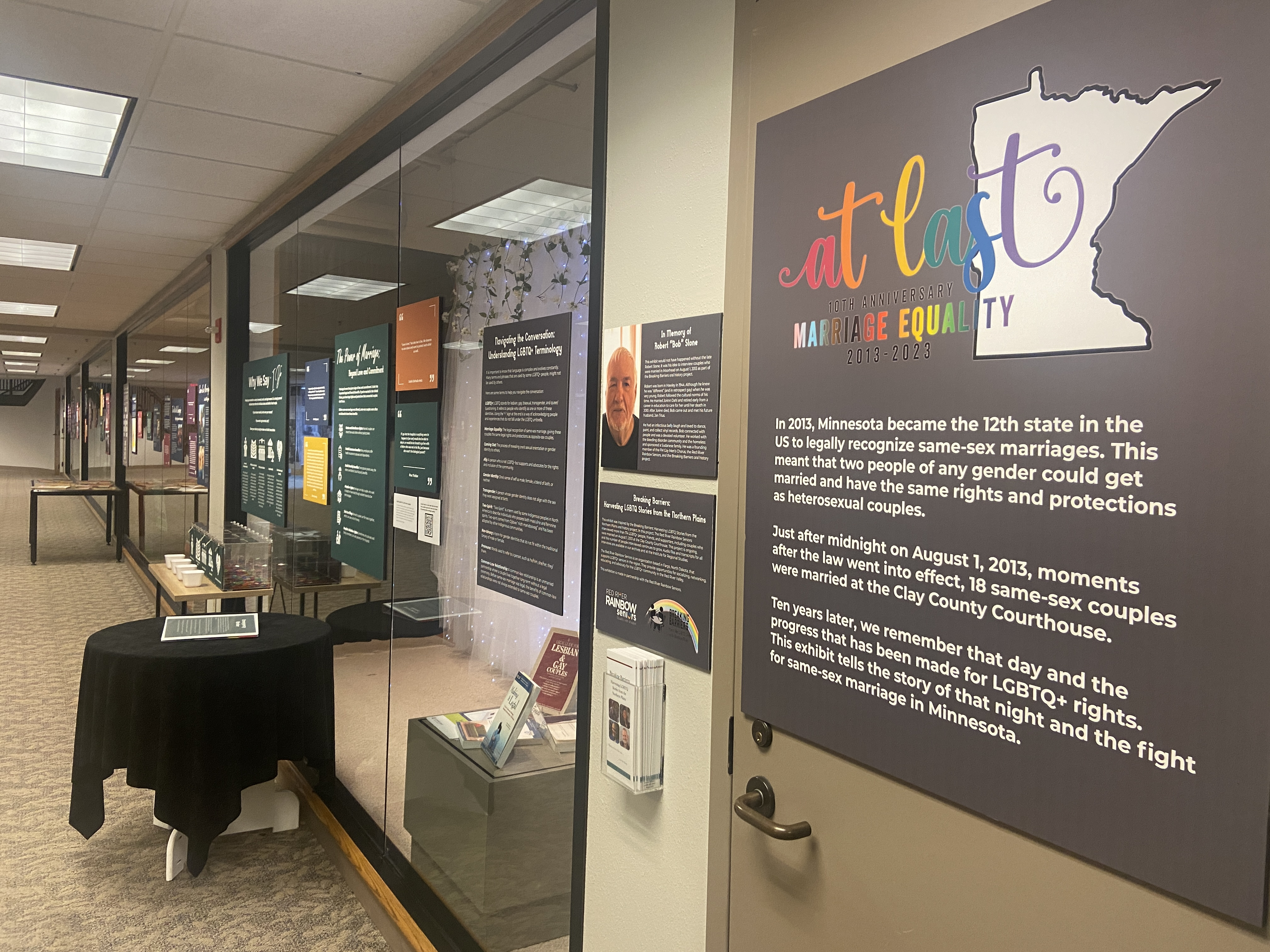
"At Last-10th Anniversary of Marriage Equality in Minnesota," exhibition interpretive panels

Interpretive exhibitions are exhibitions that require more context to explain the items being displayed. This is generally true of exhibitions devoted to scientific and historical themes, where text, dioramas, charts, maps and interactive displays may provide necessary explanation of background and concepts. Interpretive exhibitions generally require more text and more graphics than fine art exhibitions do.

The topics of interpretive graphics cover a wide range including archaeology, anthropology, ethnology, history, science, technology and natural history.

== Commercial exhibitions ==
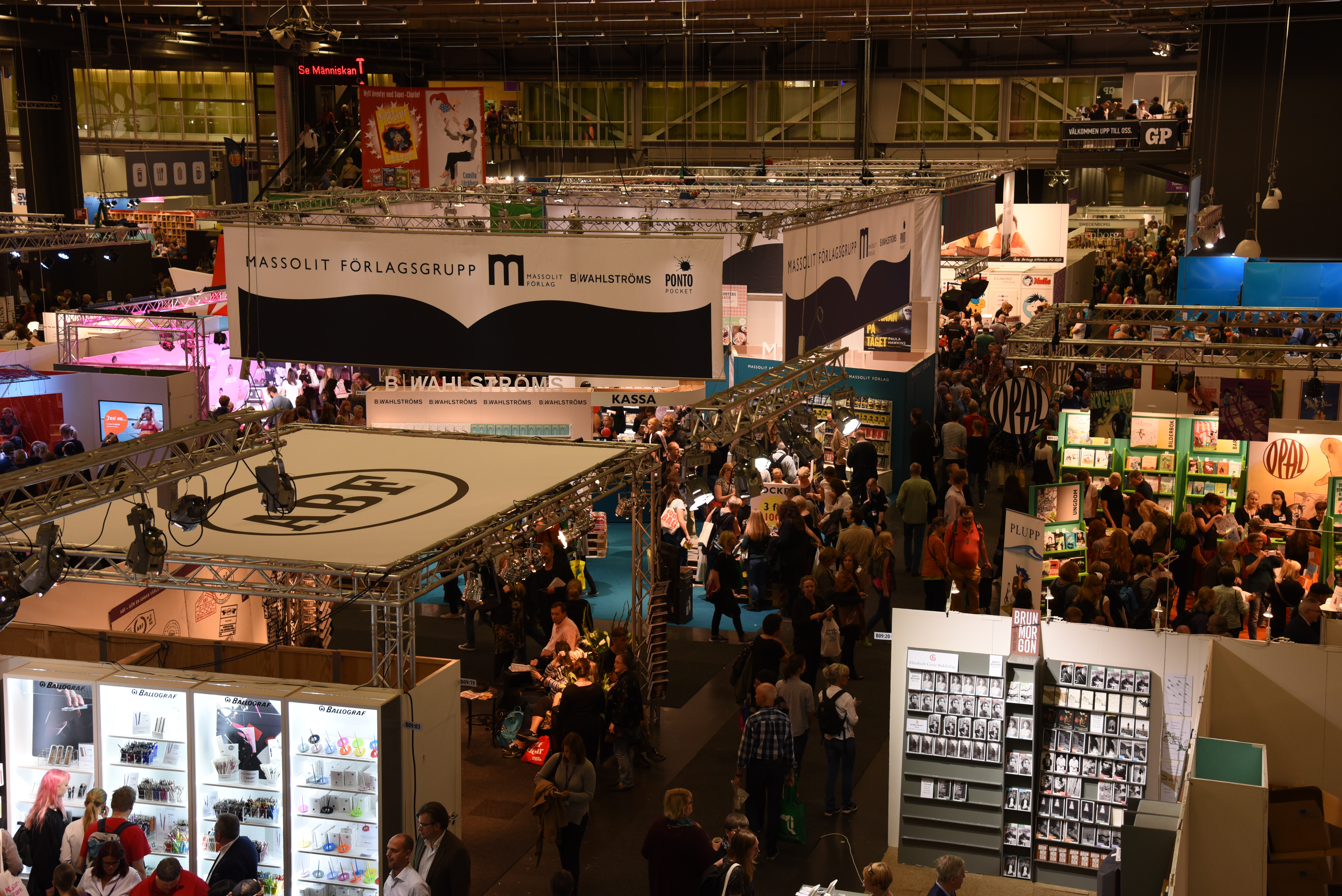
Göteborg Book Fair, Gothenburg, Sweden

Commercial exhibitions, generally called trade fairs, trade shows or expos, are usually organized so that organizations in a specific interest or industry can showcase and demonstrate their latest products, service, study activities of rivals and examine recent trends and opportunities. Some trade fairs are open to the public, while others can only be attended by company representatives (members of the trade) and members of the press.

== Digital exhibitions ==
Changes in scholarly communication and the rise of the Internet have led to the creation of online exhibitions or digital exhibitions. These can include the digital viewing of physical exhibits; video tours of museums, art galleries and other cultural venues; and/or online exhibitions of "born digital" art, models or educational tools. The integration of information technology into museums and archives has also created opportunities for interactive and multimedia experiences inside cultural institutions. Many museums and galleries have extensive online resources that complement or enhance their physical exhibits. For example, the British Museum, the Louvre, the MET have put their collections online. Another example from 2009, "Public Poet, Private Man," an online exhibit on the work of Henry Wadsworth Longfellow, was recognized as an outstanding digital exhibit by the Association of College and Research Libraries (ARCL).

Some museums are classified as virtual museums. They are exclusively digital and offer a wide range of online exhibitions, notably the International Museum of Women, Tucson LGBTQ Museum, Virtual Museum of Canada, Virtual Museum of Modern Nigerian Art, Museum With No Frontiers.

== See also ==
- Traveling exhibition
- Exhibition history
- Philatelic exhibition
- UFI
- Exhibition fight

== Publications ==
- Ng-He, C., Gibbons, B. (2021). Exhibits and Displays: A Practical Guide For Librarians. Rowman & Littlefield.
