= Historisches Centrum Hagen =

City museum in Germany

Coordinates: 51°20′52″N 7°29′27″E

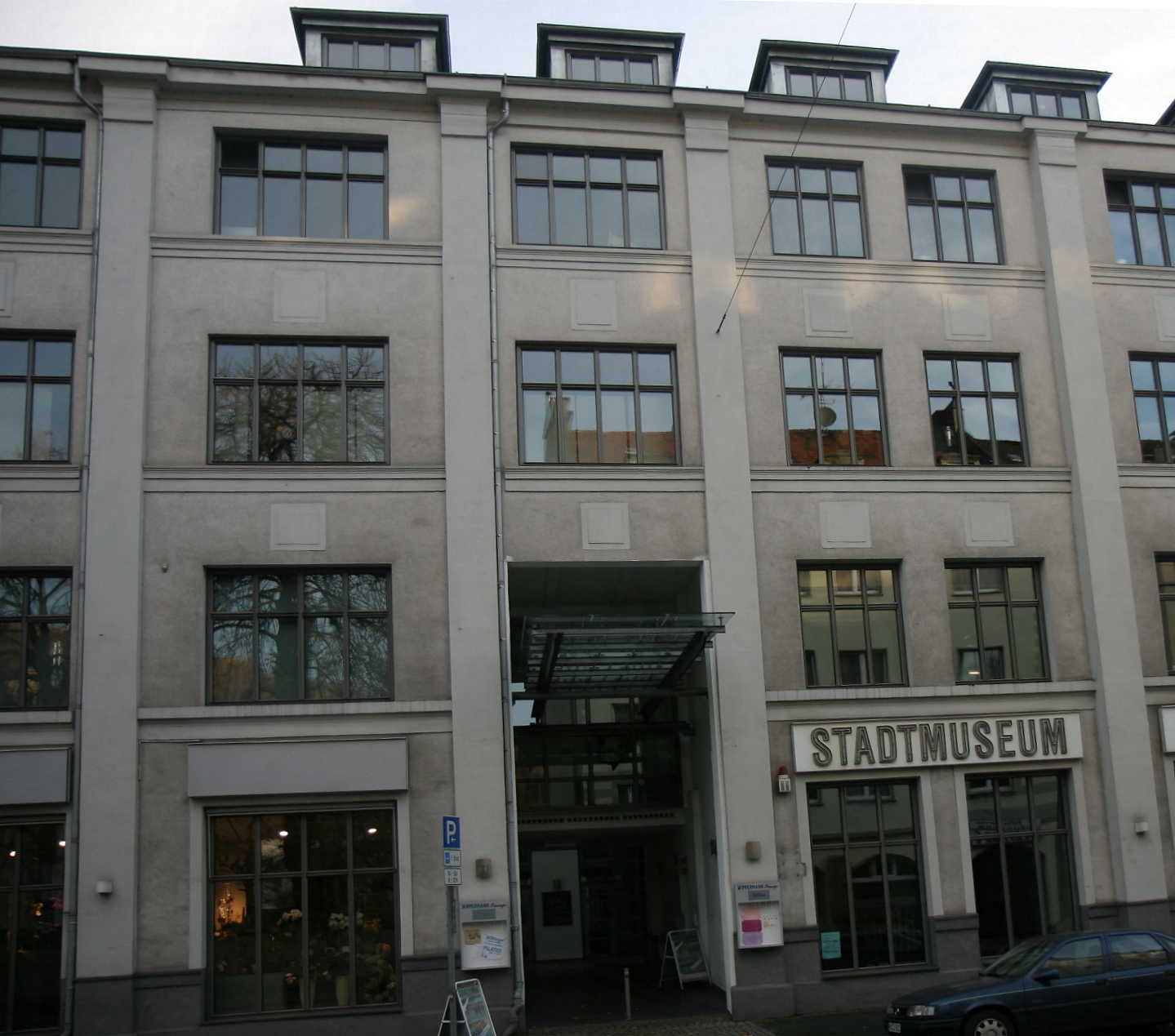
Stadtmuseum Hagen

The Historisches Centrum Hagen (HCH, in English: Historical Centre of Hagen) in Hagen, Germany, has hosted the city museum, the municipal archives, the Westphalian Music and Literature Archive, the offices of Hagen historical societies, and rooms for events, since 1998. It is located in a former building that is part of the Kettenfabrik Wippermann. It is the historical cultural centre of Hagen and gained a reputation for its exchange of exhibitions and other activities. In the field of archaeology, the Historical Centre of Hagen is responsible for the exploration and excavation of Blattenhöhle with important remains of Stone Age people.

In October 2005, a permanent exhibition on the history of the city of Hagen was opened in the Historical Centre. The extensive presentation includes a tour through the history of the city since the Middle Ages to the present. The displays include multimedia equipment, providing a leading museum presentation in North Rhine-Westphalia.

The accompanying city archives preserve the historical pictorial and written sources from the city and region. The collections include more than 250,000 negatives and photographs, a library with 25,000 books, dating back to the late 15th century, as well as music sheets from the 14th to 19th Century. One of the museum's collections is the Porzellansammlung Laufenberg-Wittmann, which contains rare material from the early 18th century onwards. A collection of coins and medals with around 65,000 individual items is also available.

In the Wasserschloss Werdringen, a burial site from the 13th century, the HCH has been running an exhibition site since November 2004, the Museum für Ur- und Frühgeschichte. The collection of sculptures, oriented to northwest Sauerland, is one of the most important geological and archaeological museums in North Rhine-Westphalia with significant visitor numbers. Particularly popular are the varied museum-educational programs for school classes, children and adolescents as well as adults.

On the Internet, the HCH with Historisches Centrum Online (HCO) is one of the largest and oldest (since 1994) local and regional history, general historical and museum-specific material relating to Germany, acting as an online portal. The HCO cooperates with institutions such as the Humboldt University in Berlin, the German Museum Association, the International Council of Museums (ICOM) and H-Net. In addition, the Historical Centre in the Virtual Library network hosts the catalogues and information portals of the time, the Early Modern period and museums.

One important field of museum education of the Historical Centre is the project work with pupils, which will be presented in the context of temporary exhibitions to a broad public (such as the Presentation School @ Museum in the years 2011 and 2012).

Since 2012, the Historical Centre of Hagen has been part of the Cultural Department, headed by Tayfun Belgin. Ralf Blank is responsible for the museums and archives.

== See also ==
- Hagen Westphalian Open-Air Museum
