= Online exhibition =

An online exhibition, also referred to as a virtual exhibition, online gallery, cyber-exhibition, is an exhibition whose venue is cyberspace.

Museums and other organizations create online exhibitions for many reasons. For example, an online exhibition may: expand on material presented at, or generate interest in, or create a durable online record of, a physical exhibition; save production costs (insurance, shipping, installation); solve conservation/preservation problems (e.g., handling of fragile or rare objects); reach lots more people: "Access to information is no longer restricted to those who can afford travel and museum visits, but is available to anyone who has access to a computer with an Internet connection.

Unlike physical exhibitions, online exhibitions are not restricted by time; they are not forced to open and close but may be available 24 hours a day.

In the nonprofit world, many museums, libraries, archives, universities, and other cultural organizations create online exhibitions. A database of such exhibitions is Library and Archival Exhibitions on the Web.

Online exhibition organizers may use techniques such as marquee text, display advertisements, and in-event emails to engage patrons.

Various guides have been published to help organizations create effective online exhibitions.

The earliest museum with a physical existence to create a programme of substantial online exhibitions with high resolution images of artefacts was the Museum of the History of Science in Oxford, the first of which, The Measurers: a Flemish Image of Mathematics in the Sixteenth Century and an exhibition of early photographs, were published on 21 August 1995.

== Examples of online exhibitions ==
- International Museum of Women is an online-only museum that does not have a physical building and instead offers online exhibitions about women's issues globally as well as an online community. Online exhibitions include "Imagining Ourselves" (launched 2006) about women's identity, "Women, Power and Politics" (2008), and "Economica: Women and the Global Economy" (2009).
- Tucson LGBTQ Museum is an online-only museum that does not have a physical building and instead offers online exhibitions about LGBTQ history. The online photographic, audio, video, text, and other historical exhibitions include exhibits from the 1700s to the present day. The effort began in the summer of 1967 and spanned almost 50 years.
