= Jasmine Directory =

Human-edited web directory

- Website type: Web directory
- Available in: English
- Creators: Pécsi András; Robert Gomboș
- Website: www.jasminedirectory.com
- Commercial: Yes
- Registration: None
- Launched: 2009; 17 years ago
- Current status: Active

Jasmine Directory is a human-edited web directory providing websites and businesses categorized topically and regionally. It offers thirteen topic-based categories and one region-based category with hand-picked and reviewed users' suggested resources. Jasmine Directory was founded in 2009 by Pécsi András and Robert Gomboș and is headquartered in Valley Cottage, New York. It won eight prizes during 2013–14 for its editorial discretion and manually added resources. Jasmine Directory proved to be useful for SEO Google search results since they manually add about 90% of the resources.

== History ==
The directory was launched in 2009 at the Budapest University of Technology and Economics by Pécsi András and Robert Gomboș. It operates from Valley Cottage, New York.

== Operation and structure ==
Jasmine Directory lists educational resources and businesses of public interest, which can be filtered based on business category. Jasmine Directory's editors manually add resources to the index, which according to co-founder Gomboș represents 90% of its listings. Businesses and site owners can also suggest their websites for review by paying a "suggestion fee;" however, inclusion is not guaranteed if the suggested resources do not comply with the editorial guidelines, in which case the review fee is refunded. The annual fee for standard listings is $59. Site owners are not paying for placement, but they are paid for editing and the administrative effort to review and create a listing. The directory labels listings chosen by editors using an "EP" mark to separate those websites from ones submitted by site owners. To suggest a resource for inclusion, users may select an appropriate category; they can also customize their listing by adding their websites' social media fan pages and contact information based on which businesses' Google Maps location will be generated accordingly. Once the listing is posted, its publisher can edit the details any time, but an upgrade feature is also available for those who change the listing. The directory runs an audit of all external resources every two to three months so as to remove dead links, dropped or parked domains, etc. Every website that doesn't come back online within a timeframe is deleted from their index. Likewise, redirected sites and sites with questionable legitimacy are turned down.

The directory is organized by topic and region into 14 categories. Each main category has several subcategories, including recreation and sports, regional, home and garden, business and finance, and computers and technology. Each category and subcategory is described and contains a relevant image. A blog where users can read industry-specific articles is also featured. In an interview, Gomboș stated the directory's purpose is to list educational references along with local amenities and businesses of public interest.

=== Main categories ===
The 14 main categories are:

1. Arts & Humanities
2. Business & Finance
3. Computers & Technology
4. Health & Fitness
5. Home & Garden
6. Internet & Marketing
7. Kids & Teens
8. Leisure & Travel
9. News & Politics
10. People & Society
11. Recreation & Sports
12. Regional
13. Science & Reference
14. Shopping & E-commerce

== Reception ==
Between 2013 and 2014 Jasmine Directory was rated and awarded eight times in "Top Ten Web Directories", by former DMOZ meta editor and owner and operator of the Magic City Morning Star Ken Anderson. For Anderson's list, 90 general web directories were reviewed quarterly and assessed in five areas including aesthetics, size, intuitiveness, quality and usefulness.

As of December 2014 Moz had assigned Jasmine Directory a Domain Authority of 60/100, a Page Authority of 67/100, MozRank of 6.81, and a MozTrust of 6.64. Its Majestic Trust Flow was 59, while the Citation Flow value was 49. In 2016, a listing in the directory appeared to be useful for search engine optimization for local Google search results. The same year, the directory obtained a score of 5 in a rating session conducted by the Association of Internet Research Specialists and published in the Internet Information Resource Book where search engines, web directories, online archives and online databases have been rated on a scale from 1 to 5+.

According to information posted on the Social Implications blog, Jasmine Directory appeared to be compliant with Google's general guidelines as of February 2018. Essentially, this means that they use editorial discretion to permit or deny which businesses they allow in their directory listings. Also, the Daily News Egypt found the directory to follow "the rules set forth by Google". Ann Smarty, search marketer and columnist at Entrepreneur, found the directory provided a "valuable user experience". In 2018, Shawn Hessinger, an industry-specific author and the executive editor of Small Business Trends, praised the directory as "selective", while in a more mixed review, an editor of TNT labelled it as "very traditional" and "tad simplistic" with an "old looking interface". An article published by The New Indian Express noted that "while Jasmine Directory's layout it's beginning to age, it still looks fresh and clean." Leo Giosuè from The Jerusalem Post named Jasmine Directory as "one of the most prominent directories in the industry."

Matt Hodgson, owner of Addme, a SEO company founded in 1996, opines that "when done the right way, directories such as Jasmine Directory are far more reliable than a typical search engine result because they are edited by real people who go through every link to determine whether it provides any relevant information." He also gave the directory a grade A, pointing that Jasmine Directory is "more user oriented in so many ways and Google compliant as well."

== See also ==
- List of web directories
