= Timway =

- Website type: Web portal
- Owner: Timway
- Creator: Timmy Yu
- Website: http://timway.com/
- Commercial: Mixed
- Registration: Optional
- Launched: 1997 July

TiMway (simplified Chinese: 添达; traditional Chinese: 添達; pinyin: Tiān Dá) is a web portal and directory primarily serving Hong Kong. The Timway Hong Kong Search Engine is designed for searching web sites in Hong Kong. It supports web search query in English and Chinese, and indexes web pages in both languages.

The Timway Hong Kong Search Engine was introduced in 1997 by Tim Yu. It was the first directory in Traditional Chinese and sorted results by popularity and freshness instead of alphabetical order.

Sina.com.hk used Timway in addition to Google for finding Hong Kong webpages. Yahoo also cooperated with Timway for the search engine marketing business. According to web traffic analysis company Alexa, Timway was one of the top ten most popular websites in Hong Kong by 2009.

Timway now also sells web hosting and other services.

== History ==
The search engine was first created by its founder Tim Yu in July 1997. As an engineer and a book lover, Yu discovered that a Hong Kong-oriented search engine would be more effective in processing massive data (in both English and Chinese) and allow the user to get the exact information required. Seeing the potential in this area, Yu started a searchable directory in Hong Kong. This initiative started earlier than Yahoo!HK, which marked a milestone in the developments of the Hong Kong search portal business.

Milestones:

- Founded in July 1997 by Tim Yu, using a former domain name of hksrch.com.
- Registered as a Hong Kong registered company in February 1998.
- Changed the domain name to timway.com in 1999.
- Education portal was established in 2000. A wide range of education courses were supplied. The cooperation with tens of education providers made it an education supermarket. Finding education courses became more convenient.
- In 2005, Timway appointed Professor Michael Chau as the senior technology advisor.
- By 2009, Timway was one of the top ten websites in Hong Kong according to web traffic analysis company Alexa, ranked by popularity.
- Timway ran a website called Timway Quiz, which made use of Adobe Coldfusion for enhanced interactivity with the users.
- Timway contributed to academic studies whereby user information-seeking behavior when using non-English search engines was examined.
- In 2000, Timway began to provide eCommerce solutions.
- In 2012, Timway started to offer digital marketing services to clients which matched potential consumers with related businesses through various online channels.
- In 2015, Timway developed Online Food Ordering Platform, enabling restaurants to handle take-away orders in shorter time, lowered costs and offered convenience to customers.

== See also ==
- List of web directories
- Search engine marketing
