= IndUS Business Journal =

American business-to-business newspaper

Founded in 2000, IndUS Business Journal is a national business-to-business newspaper headquartered in Waltham, Massachusetts, USA. Published fortnightly, the IndUS Business Journal is the sole business-to-business newspaper covering the Indian and South Asian business community in the United States, as well as trade and investment issues between South Asia and the United States.

The IndUS Business Journal is ranked in the Top 25 Business News Sites by Yahoo! Directory.

== Senior Management ==
- Upendra Mishra, Founder, President, and Publisher
- Peter Faylor, Online Editor

== History ==
Launched in 2000, IndUS Business Journal was founded by Upendra Mishra, founder, president, and CEO of The Mishra Group, a diversified advertising, marketing, and media firm that also publishes Boston/SF, and INDIA New England. Since its inception, the IndUS Business Journal has grown to a national circulation of 18,000 and a total readership of 55,000. The publication serves a South Asian and Asian Indian readership, targeting entrepreneurs and business executives.

== Editorial Content ==
The IndUS Business Journal covers business, technology, health care, finance, law, venture capital, and entrepreneurship, presented from the perspective of South Asian and Asian Indian professionals. Regular sections include technology, health and medicine, franchise, hospitality, and international business. The publication also features supplement focus sections, which examine a diverse range of issues related to the South Asian and Asian Indian business community.

Other notable features include the publication of Top25/Top 100 lists and customized industry reports. The lists document information regarding the South Asian and Asian Indian market, its prominence in corporate America and rankings of organizations that actively work within this market. IndUS Business Journal also authors an annual venture capital survey, which examines venture capital funding of South Asian-run businesses in the United States.

== Annual Business Awards ==
The IndUS Business Journal also publishes an annual business awards supplement, which acknowledges members of the South Asian and Asian Indian community who have made significant contributions to growing market sectors such as financial services, venture capital, franchise, biotechnology, pharmaceutical, hospitality, technology, outsourcing, exports and imports, and services industries. Awards include Business Person of the Year and Best Business Idea, among many others.
