= Anime Web Turnpike =

Anime and manga web directory

Anime Web Turnpike (Anipike)
- Website type: Website Linking
- Available in: 1 languages
- List of languages English
- Founded: August 1995
- Dissolved: 2014
- Country of origin: United States
- Founder: Jay Fubler Harvey
- Parent: The Anime Broadcasting Network, Inc
- Website: www.anipike.com
- Commercial: No
- Registration: Optional
- Launched: August 1995
- Current status: Dead

Anime Web Turnpike (also known as Anipike) was a web directory founded in August 1995 by Jay Fubler Harvey. It served as a large database of links to various anime and manga websites. With well over 40,000 links, it had one of the largest organized collections of anime and manga related links. Users could add their own website to the database by setting up a username on the site and adding it to the applicable category. The website also had services such as a community forum, chat room, and a magazine. The Anime Broadcasting Network, Inc. acquired the Anime Web Turnpike in 2000 with plans to enhance and expand the site, but multiple technical issues delayed these plans. The site went offline in 2014, but came back online by 2016, with no new posts since 2014. As of 2021, the website had not been updated.

== Reception ==
In 1995, the site was mentioned among 101 Internet sites to visit. The site and its creator were featured in the 2003 documentary film Otaku Unite!. In 2003, Anime Web Turnpike was ranked the number three "must visit" anime website by the online magazine Animefringe.
