= Library and Archival Exhibitions on the Web =

- Website type: Web directory
- Owner: Smithsonian Institution
- Creators: Diane Shaw (current), Andrea Bean Hough
- Website: https://www.sil.si.edu/SILPublications/Online-Exhibitions/
- Commercial: No
- Launched: 1995; 31 years ago
- Current status: Active

Library and Archival Exhibitions on the Web is an international database of online exhibitions which is a service of the Smithsonian Institution Libraries.

== Overview ==
Two categories of online exhibitions are included in the database: exhibitions created by libraries, archives, historical societies, and other scholarly institutions; and museum exhibitions with major emphasis on library and archival materials.

Several of these online exhibitions were originally created to accompany exhibitions physically situated at their respective institutions, but a growing percentage exist solely in remotely accessible format. The database is searchable by title, subject, and sponsoring institution.

== History ==
The website is based on an online guide to library exhibits on the web, created by Andrea Bean Hough in 1995. The guide was maintained by the University of Houston Libraries until it had grown to some 350 links in 1998–99, and staffing considerations made it necessary for the university to discontinue participation in the project. Since then, the guide has been curated by Diane Shaw, Special Collections Librarian at the Smithsonian Institution Libraries. As of 2011, it has grown to include over 6,000 links to online exhibitions.

== Recognition ==
Choice: Current Reviews for Academic Libraries, a publication of the Association of College and Research Libraries, awarded Editor's Pick to the database in August 2010, saying it was "the most comprehensive source for existing digital exhibitions." It was also listed under Best of the Web by New York Public Library and had previously been rewarded Site of the Month by LibrarySpot.

== See also ==
- Virtual Library museums pages
