= Virtual Library museums pages =

Online museum directory

Virtual Library museums pages (VLmp)
- VLmp logo
- Available in: English
- Founded: 1994
- Headquarters: University of Oxford (in 1994), Oxford, {{{location_country}}}
- Area served: Worldwide
- Creator: Jonathan Bowen et al.
- Founder: Jonathan Bowen
- Industry: Museums
- Services: Web directory
- Parent: Virtual Library; International Council of Museums
- Website: museums.fandom.com
- Launched: 1994
- Current status: Hosted by MuseumsWiki

The Virtual Library museums pages (VLmp) formed an early leading directory of online museums around the world.

== History ==
The VLmp online directory resource was founded by Jonathan Bowen in 1994, originally at the Oxford University Computing Laboratory in the United Kingdom. It has been supported by the International Council of Museums (ICOM) and Museophile Limited. As part of the World Wide Web Virtual Library, initiated by Tim Berners-Lee and later managed by Arthur Secret. The main VLmp site moved to London South Bank University in the early 2000s and is now hosted on the MuseumsWiki wiki, established in 2006 and hosted by Fandom (previously Wikia) as a historical record.

The directory was developed and organised in a distributed manner by country, with around twenty people in different countries maintaining various sections. Canada, through the Canadian Heritage Information Network (CHIN), was the first country to become involved. The MDA maintained the United Kingdom section of museums, later the Collections Trust. The Historisches Centrum Hagen has maintained and hosted pages for Germany. Other countries actively participating included Romania. In total, around 20 countries were involved.

The directory was influential in the museum field during the 1990s and 2000s. It was used as a standard starting point to find museums online. It was useful for monitoring the growth of museums internationally online. It was also used for online museum surveys. It was recommended as an educational resource and included a search facility.

== Virtual Museum of Computing ==
The Virtual Museum of Computing (VMoC), part of the Virtual Library museums pages, was created as a virtual museum providing information on the history of computers and computer science. It included virtual "galleries" (e.g., on Alan Turing, curated by Andrew Hodges) and links to other computer museums. VMoC was founded in 1995, initially at the University of Oxford. As part of VLmp, it was hosted by the International Council of Museums (ICOM). VMoC was also hosted by the University of Reading and London South Bank University, with mirror sites internationally within VLmp. Later it was also provided by Museophile Limited. It then became available in archival form as a wiki on Wikia).

VMoC was reviewed by Discovery Channel, Lycos, Anbar Electronic Intelligence, Bookmark Central, Planet Science, RedOrbit, and Science NetLinks during the 1990s. It has also been referenced in books and papers. VMoC has provided computing history event reports.

== See also ==
- Library and Archival Exhibitions on the Web
- List of museums
- Virtual museum
- World Wide Web Virtual Library
