= Google Directory =

Discontinued web directory hosted by Google

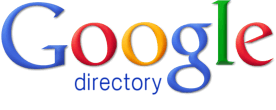
- Website type: Web directory
- Available in: Was available in about 86 languages
- Owner: Google
- Website: directory.google.com
- Commercial: No
- Registration: No
- Launched: 2000; 26 years ago
- Current status: Discontinued

The Google Directory was a web directory hosted by Google and is based on the open source project DMOZ. It was discontinued on July 20, 2011. However, the Google business places and recommended businesses is now commonly referred to as the Google directory.

== Information ==
The Google Directory was organized into 16 main categories. The directory with its upper level topics and sub-categories could provide more specific results than the usual keyword search.

- Arts
- Business
- Computers
- Games
- Health
- Home
- Kids and teens
- News
- Recreation
- Reference
- Regional
- Science
- Shopping
- Society
- Sports
- World

The World link offered the directory in other languages. The Kids and Teens link was a separate web archive for kids and teens.

The Google Directory was based on the Open Directory Project. Unlike the keyword search function of Google, the directory organization was created by humans.

== Structure ==
=== Main page ===
The main page had links to the 16 main categories, along with the World and Kids and Teens links. There was a search box on top that allowed users to search the Google Directory. On top of that was the slogan in green letters: "The web organized by topic into categories." On top of that were links to other Google services.

=== Main category pages ===
Each main category page had links to sub-main category pages in alphabetical order, as well as a search box on top of it. Each sub-category entry is followed by a number that gives the number of items in that sub-category. Sub-categories would be created as needed, and eventually the user would get to a page with no more subcategories. Each page might have links to related categories. Some links were redirects to other pages.

=== World link ===
The World link had the names of languages. If the user clicked on one, they would be taken to a version of the directory in that language.
