= Biographicon =

The Biographicon
- Website type: web directory
- Owner: self-owned
- Creators: Daniel Terhorst, Ethan Herdrick
- Website: www.biographicon.com (Archived copy)
- Registration: Yes
- Launched: March 1, 2008; 18 years ago
- Current status: Offline

The Biographicon was a wiki-based website containing biographies of famous and non-famous people, that existed from March to August 2008. The site also showed connections between individuals covered, and explained the circumstances under which they met.

== History ==
The site was launched on March 1, 2008 by computer programmer Ethan Herdrick and business partner Daniel Terhorst. The site had received a small amount of seed funding from venture capital firm Y Combinator. Herdrick served as the company's Chief Executive Officer, while Terhorst was Chief Technology Officer.

The blog The Wired Campus labelled the Biographicon "Wikipedia for non-notables" in reference to the fact that unlike the online encyclopedia Wikipedia, the Biographicon did not have a notability threshold for inclusion, operating under the tagline "all the people of the world". Writing for The Independent, Rhodri Marsden commented that on the Biographicon, "anyone can put up details about themselves without fear of being nominated for deletion", though he noted that since the site operated using wiki software, "there's always the chance that someone will log in and alter your entry to include the time you cried on a school trip because someone stole your sandwiches." Ars Technica describes it as "a potential "who's who" of world history." Michael Arrington of TechCrunch noted that it might have problems gaining traction.

On August 21, 2008, the website was shut down, due to what its founders called "insufficient user interest in the site." A brief attempt to restore the site soon afterward proved unsuccessful.
