= 2345.com =

Web directory

2345.com is a Chinese web directory founded in 2005. The website is the second most used web directory in China. It is ranked 47th place in China and has a worldwide ranking of 419 on Alexa, however, when downloaded, contains adware. It is hosted at Abitcool China Inc. Beijing, China.
