= Yahoo Directory =

Web directory

Yahoo! Directory
- Website type: Web directory
- Owner: Yahoo!
- Website: Archived November 22, 2014, at the Wayback Machine
- Commercial: Yes
- Launched: January 1994; 32 years ago
- Current status: Defunct as of December 26, 2014

The Yahoo! Directory was a web directory which at one time rivaled DMOZ in size. The directory was Yahoo!'s first offering and started in 1994 under the name Jerry and David's Guide to the World Wide Web. When Yahoo! changed its main results to crawler-based listings under Yahoo! Search in October 2002, the human-edited directory's significance dropped, but it was still being updated as of August 19, 2014. Users could browse thousands of listings which were organized in 7 or more tiers. For example, if you were was looking for a site on chess they might follow a path such as: recreation -> games -> board games -> chess.

The directory originally offered two options for suggesting websites for possible listing: "Standard", which was free, and a paid submission process which offered expedited review. "Standard" was dropped, and a non-refundable review fee of $299 ($600 for adult sites) was required when suggesting any website. If listed, the same amount was charged annually.

On September 26, 2014, Yahoo! announced that it would be closing the directory on December 31, 2014. This followed the closing of a number of country-specific directories in 2010.

== See also ==
- List of web directories
- List of defunct Yahoo! services
