= International Museum of Women =

The International Museum of Women (IMOW), headquartered in San Francisco, California, United States, is an online museum that covers women's issues worldwide. Since March 2014 it has been part of the Global Fund for Women.

== Creation and expansion ==
I.M.O.W. was founded as the Women's Heritage Museum in 1985. As the Women's Heritage Museum, it produced exhibitions, public programs, book fairs, educational resources for Women's History Month and honored local women. In 1997, a group of Bay Area teachers spurred the drive to create a larger museum by raising donations.

Since its expansion under the new name in 1997, I.M.O.W. has organized exhibitions, hosted public fora, developed educational curriculum for schools, and created a number of speaker series. As of June 2009, the museum exists as a virtual museum. A 2005 effort to build a 100,000-square-foot (9,300 m^{2}) facility for $120 million failed.

== Exhibitions ==
The museum comprises several online exhibits. One of the exhibits, Imagining Ourselves, an exhibit of artwork and writing covering how women aged 20 to 40 from around the world define their respective generations, edited into an anthology published in March 2006 by New World Library. Economica: Women and the Global Economy, created in 2010, covered how women from around the world interact with money and their roles in the economy.

== Merger ==
On March 5, 2014, IMOW merged with Global Fund for Women, and is now described as 'now part of Global Fund for Women'.
