= Zeal (web) =

Web directory

- Founded: 1999
- Dissolved: March 28, 2006
- Headquarters: Culver City, California
- Founders: Brian Goler and Kevin Berk
- Website: www.zeal.com
- Current status: Defunct

Zeal was a volunteer-built web directory launched by Brian Goler and Kevin Berk in 1999, and then acquired by LookSmart in October 2000 for $20 million. Zeal combined the work of Looksmart's paid editors with that of volunteers who profiled websites and placed them in a hierarchy of subcategories. The resulting categories and profiles were downloaded at intervals by LookSmart and its partners, other search companies such as MSN, Lycos, and Altavista, for use in their own systems with or without modification.

Paid editors attended to commercial sites and oversaw the voluntary work on non-commercial sites.

Volunteers worked under a defined set of Guidelines and were required to pass an introductory level test on those Guidelines before submitting site profiles or edits. As points and experience were acquired, volunteers could elect to take a further exam which allowed them to "adopt" and create topic categories of special interest. They could then move up the organizational structure from Community Member to Zealot to Expert Zealot, acquiring additional tools and oversight responsibility at each level. Expert Zealots, who could move or delete some whole categories, monitored the day-to-day operations of the non-commercial portion of the directory and acted as mentors to new members.

Active volunteers were found in many English-speaking countries (particularly North America, United Kingdom, India, Australia, and New Zealand) and some other countries such as Spain, Switzerland, and Japan.

By March 2003, Zeal had passed the 250,000 listings mark; eventually it passed the 400,000 mark due, in part, to the Zeal Charity Drive contest of October 2003, which saw over $25,000 distributed around prominent charities such as the WWF.

After Looksmart's acquisition of Zeal, its internet traffic as measured by Alexa fluctuated considerably; after MSN withdrew from the related partnership, Zeal traffic declined from "usually better than 2000th" (mid-2003) to "about 5000th" (mid-2004).

Branch offices in Australia, Canada, and the United Kingdom were closed in about 2004, and the corresponding directories were said to have been sold but/and were gradually merged with the main directory.

The Zeal directory closed on March 28, 2006 and was sold in October 2007 for $50,000.
