= Dalilmasr =

Egyptian online directory

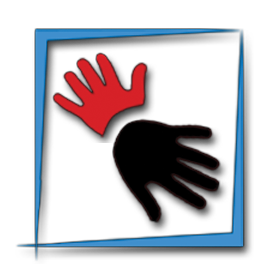
Dalilmasr Logo

Dalilmasr is an online Egyptian directory, which provides information about any service, product, and/or tool available in the Egyptian market. The website includes information about companies, shops, showrooms, and service providers in the Egyptian Region.

In the five main languages it serves more than two billion people.
Logo Identity:The logo is in two palms of the hand applauding (conducting the valued promised service) in black and red color along with white background (Egyptian Flag Colors), the other right and left acute blue triangles meaning the Nile River welfare.
