= Tucson Gay Museum =

Museum in Tucson, Arizona

- Established: June 10, 1967; 58 years ago
- Location: Virtual Online and Traveling Mobile LGBTQ+ Exhibits
- Website: www.tucsongaymuseum.org

The Tucson Gay Museum maintains an extensive collection of archival materials, artifacts and graphic arts relating to the history of LGBT people in the United States, with a focus on the LGBT communities of Tucson, Arizona and Phoenix, Arizona. It became a member of the Arizona LGBTQIA+ Archives in 2020.

== History ==
Established on June 10, 1967, the Tucson Gay Museum began as a project to archive the history of the Gay and Lesbian community in Tucson, Arizona. The collection has since expanded to encompass photographs, posters, flyers, publications, and memorabilia that chronicle the lives, places, events, and memories of the LGBTQ+ community. While its primary focus is on Tucson and other Arizona cities such as Phoenix, the museum also features select items from major cities across the United States, including locations in Alaska, California, Hawaii, Texas, Washington State and Washington D.C.

The archives house a vast collection of original photographs and records spanning from the 1800s to the 2020s. These documents chronicle the evolution of Gay and Lesbian groups in Phoenix and Tucson, capturing their political initiatives, organizations, bar histories, and club scenes. They shine a spotlight on Gay bathhouses, notable Drag Queen performers, and the non-political 'Gay' Pride celebrations of the 1950s and beyond. The collection also delves into somber moments, detailing Anti-Gay Hate Crimes, murders, and protests. Additionally, the archives honor Community Centers, Youth Groups, AIDS Organizations, Business Leagues, and the individuals who shaped these communities

Tucson Gay Museum is currently one of the museums and historical archives collections within the Arizona LGBTQ+ Museum. Museum historical preservation projects include production of LGBTQ+ related historical video and movie documentaries.

== Traveling Phoenix Tucson LGBTQ+ Memories Projects And Related Exhibits ==
The Tucson LGBTQ+ Memories Project, which encompasses the histories of Gay, Lesbian, Bisexual, Transgender, Queer, and other identities, curates traveling historical exhibits. These exhibits have been displayed in diverse venues such as Tucson, Phoenix, the University of Arizona, Washington D.C., the National LGBTQ Museum, and various local and state groups. Some of the project's notable exhibits include:

- Memorium Wall of Remembrance
- Hate Crime Victims Memorial (spanning from the 1970s to 2014 in both Tucson and Phoenix)
- History of AIDS Service Groups (in both Tucson and Phoenix)
- Gay & Lesbian Bars History (from both cities)
- Pride Events & Organizations' History (for Tucson and Phoenix)
- LGBTQ+ Organizations' Historical Overview (separate exhibits for Tucson and Phoenix)
- LGBTQ+ Places Memorial Project Exhibits for Tucson
