= World Wide Web Virtual Library =

Online web directory

The WWW Virtual Library
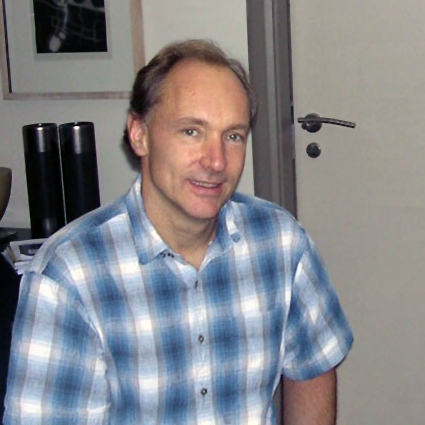
- Tim Berners-Lee, the founder of the Virtual Library
- Available in: English
- Founded: 1991
- Headquarters: CERN (in 1991), Geneva, Switzerland
- Area served: Worldwide
- Creator: Tim Berners-Lee
- Founder: Tim Berners-Lee
- Editors: Arthur Secret, et al.
- Key people: Tim Berners-Lee, Arthur Secret, Bertrand Ibrahim
- Services: Web directory
- Website: vlib.org
- Commercial: No
- Launched: 1991

The World Wide Web Virtual Library (WWW VL) was the first index of content on the World Wide Web and still operates as a directory of e-texts and information sources on the web.

== Overview ==
The Virtual Library was started by Tim Berners-Lee creator of HTML and the World Wide Web itself, in 1991 at CERN in Geneva. Unlike commercial index sites, it is run by a loose confederation of volunteers, who compile pages of key links for particular areas in which they are experts. It is sometimes informally referred to as the "WWWVL", the "Virtual Library" or just "the VL".

The individual indexes, or virtual libraries live on hundreds of different servers around the world. A set of index pages linking these individual libraries is maintained at vlib.org, in Geneva only a few kilometres from where the VL began life. A mirror of this index is kept at East Anglia in the United Kingdom.

== History ==
The Virtual Library was first conceived and run by Tim Berners-Lee in 1991, and later expanded, organised and managed for several years by Arthur Secret as the "virtual librarian", before it became a formally established association with Gerard Manning as its Council's first chairman. The late Bertrand Ibrahim was a key contributor to the pre-association phase of the Virtual Library's development and then served as its Secretary until his untimely death in 2001 at the age of 46. A brief history, with links to archived pages and screenshots, is maintained on the Vlib website.

The Virtual Library grew over the years. For example, there is the WWW-VL History Central Catalogue, which was launched on 21 September 1993 by Lynn H. Nelson at Kansas University. From April 2004, it was relocated at the European University Institute, Florence, Italy, where a history of the catalogue is also available. The Virtual Library museums pages (VLmp) were added by Jonathan Bowen to the Virtual Library to cover museums in 1994.

In 2005, the central WWW Virtual Library website (vlib.org) was taken over by a new member, Michael Chapman, leading to the demise of the project. Access by any other party was denied after a change in password. The elected council, consisting of established maintainers of individual virtual libraries, was ignored, and a new council of non-maintainers with little or no association with the Virtual Library was unilaterally instated. The Virtual Library as a cohesive collective of knowledge websites maintained by experts rapidly waned.

While the Virtual Library as a cooperative of indexed sites, the first on the Web, has ceased to be, many individual virtual library sites continue to be important and valuable academic resources.

== See also ==
- Virtual Library museums pages (VLmp), the VL entry on museums
