= Web directory =

Online list or catalog of Wide sites

A web directory or link directory is an online list or catalog of websites. That is, it is a directory on the World Wide Web of (all or part of) the World Wide Web. Historically, directories typically listed entries on people or businesses, and their contact information; such directories are still in use today. A web directory includes entries about websites, including links to those websites, organized into categories and subcategories. Besides a link, each entry may include the title of the website, and a description of its contents. In most web directories, the entries are about whole websites, rather than individual pages within them (called "deep links"). Websites are often limited to inclusion in only a few categories.

There are two ways to find information on the Web: by searching or browsing. Web directories provide links in a structured list to make browsing easier. Many web directories combine searching and browsing by providing a search engine to search the directory. Unlike search engines, which base results on a database of entries gathered automatically by web crawler, most web directories are built manually by human editors. Many web directories allow site owners to submit their site for inclusion, and have editors review submissions for fitness.

Web directories may be general in scope, or limited to particular subjects or fields. Entries may be listed for free, or by paid submission (meaning the site owner must pay to have their website listed).

RSS directories are similar to web directories, but contain collections of RSS feeds, instead of links to websites.

== History ==
During the early development of the web, there was a list of web servers edited by Tim Berners-Lee and hosted on the CERN webserver. One historical snapshot from 1992 remains. He also created the World Wide Web Virtual Library, which is the oldest web directory.

=== Scope of listing ===
Most of the directories are general in on scope and list websites across a wide range of categories, regions and languages. But some niche directories focus on restricted regions, single languages, or specialist sectors. For example, there are shopping directories that specialize in the listing of retail e-commerce sites.

Examples of well-known general web directories are Yahoo! Directory (shut down at the end of 2014) and DMOZ (shut down on March 14, 2017). DMOZ was significant due to its extensive categorization and large number of listings and its free availability for use by other directories and search engines.

=== Development ===
There have been many attempts to make building web directories easier, such as using automated submission of related links by script, or any number of available PHP portals and programs.With the rise in the number of websites, programs were developed to make it easier to build and maintain websites of directories. Early directories were usually kept by hand, and later on the systems were scripted and had web-based forms to organize listings and to manage submissions. Yahoo's first directory was built in 1994 with Perl scripts to sort Web sites into a hierarchical structure.

Another approach was the Open Directory Project (DMOZ), which was founded in 1998 by a group of volunteer editors to create a directory. It was developed using flat file, HTML forms to build and manage the directory structure. With the changing technologies of web development, a number of scripts and content management systems were also created for directory management, which enabled website owners to categorize their listings and receive submissions via a web interface.

== Monetizing ==
Directories have various features in their listings, often depending upon the price paid for inclusion:

- Cost
  - Free submission – there is no charge for the review and listing of the site
  - Paid submission – a one-time or recurring fee is charged for reviewing/listing the submitted link
- No follow – there is a rel="nofollow" attribute associated with the link, meaning search engines will give no weight to the link
- Featured listing – the link is given a premium position in a category (or multiple categories) or other sections of the directory, such as the homepage. Sometimes called sponsored listing.
- Bid for position – where sites are ordered based on bids
- Affiliate links – where the directory earns commission for referred customers from the listed websites
- Reciprocity
  - Reciprocal link – a link back to the directory must be added somewhere on the submitted site in order to get listed in the directory. This strategy has decreased in popularity due to changes in SEO algorithms which can make it less valuable or counterproductive.
  - No Reciprocal link – a web directory where you will submit your links for free and no need to add link back to your website

== Human-edited web directories ==
A human-edited directory is created and maintained by editors who add links based on the policies particular to that directory. Some directories may prevent search engines from rating a displayed link by using redirects, nofollow attributes, or other techniques. Many human-edited directories, including DMOZ, World Wide Web Virtual Library, Business.com and Jasmine Directory, are edited by volunteers. These directories are sometimes criticized due to long delays in approving submissions, or for rigid organizational structures and disputes among volunteer editors.

In response to these criticisms, some volunteer-edited directories have adopted wiki technology, to allow broader community participation in editing the directory (at the risk of introducing lower-quality, less objective entries).

Another direction taken by some web directories is the paid for inclusion model. This method enables the directory to offer timely inclusion for submissions and generally fewer listings as a result of the paid model. They often offer additional listing options to further enhance listings, including features listings and additional links to inner pages of the listed website. These options typically have an additional fee associated but offer significant help and visibility to sites and/or their inside pages.

== Bid for Position directories ==
Bid for Position directories, also known as bidding web directories, are paid-for-inclusion web directories where the listings of websites in the directory are ordered according to their bid amount. They are special in that the more a person pays, the higher up the list of websites in the directory they go. With the higher listing, the website becomes more visible and increases the chances that visitors who browse the directory will click on the listing.

== Propagation ==
Web directories will often make themselves accessing by more and more URLs by acquiring the domain registrations of defunct websites as soon as they expire, a practice known as Domain drop catching.

== See also ==
- List of web directories
- Lists of websites – this itself is a web directory
- Web portal

=== Link destinations ===
- Deep links
- Home pages

=== Types of web directory ===
- Business directory

=== Other link organization and presentation systems ===
- Webring
- Bookmark manager
  - Enterprise bookmarking
  - Social bookmarking
- Search engine
  - Search engine results page (SERP)
