= North Carolina Award =

The North Carolina Award is the highest civilian award bestowed by the U.S. state of North Carolina. It is awarded in the four fields of science, literature, the fine arts, and public service. Sometimes referred to as the "Nobel Prize of North Carolina", the award has been given to up to nine individuals each year since 1964. The awards, provided for by chapters 140A and 143B of the North Carolina General Statutes, are chosen by the North Carolina Awards Committee appointed by the Governor of North Carolina and supervised by the North Carolina Department of Natural and Cultural Resources.

The award was designed by sculptor Paul Manship and was one of the last commissions he completed before his death.

== History ==
On June 22, 1961, the North Carolina General Assembly passed legislation creating the North Carolina Awards. The enacting statute provided for awards for "Literature, Science, the Fine Arts and Public Service" to be conferred upon five citizens and one former citizen of the state every year. The program was designed to be a overseen by a five-person commission appointed by the governor. The commission would in turn appoint committees for each awarding category who would select the awardees.

The award medal was designed by Paul Manship. The first five awards were issued in 1964.

== Structure and process ==
The North Carolina Award is administered by the North Carolina Department of Natural and Cultural Resources. Nominations are open to the public, though decisions are made by the North Carolina Awards Committee, which is made up of five persons appointed by the governor. Up to six awards may be conferred annually. Awardees are given a gold-plated silver medallion intended to be worn on a red, white, and blue ribbon around the neck.

== Award winners ==
=== 1960s ===
1964

- Literature: Inglis Fletcher
- Science: John Couch
- Fine Arts: Francis Speight
- Public Service: John Morehead, Clarence Poe

1965

- Literature: Paul Green, Gerald Johnson
- Science: Frederick A. Wolf
- Fine Arts: Hunter Johnson
- Public Service: Frank Porter Graham

1966

- Literature: Bernice Kelly Harris
- Science: Oscar Rice
- Fine Arts: Arthur G. Odell Jr.
- Public Service: Luther Hodges

1967

- Literature: Jonathan Worth Daniels
- Science: Carl W. Gottschalk, H. Houston Merritt
- Fine Arts: Benjamin F. Swalin
- Public Service: Albert Coates

1968

- Literature: Vermont C. Royster, Charles Russell
- Science: Stanley Stephens
- Fine Arts: Hobson Pittman
- Public Service: Robert Lee Humber

1969

- Literature: Ovid Pierce,
- Science: Kenneth Brinkhous
- Fine Arts: Charles Stanford, Jr.
- Public Service: May G. L. Kellenberger

=== 1970s ===
1970

- Literature: Frances Gray Patton
- Science: Philip Handler
- Fine Arts: Henry C. Pearson
- Public Service: Terry Sanford

1971

- Literature: Guy Owen
- Science: no award
- Fine Arts: James Semans & Mary Semans
- Public Service: Capus Waynick, James E. Webb

1972

- Literature: John Ehle
- Science: Edward David, Jr., Harold Hotelling
- Fine Arts: Sidney Blackmer
- Public Service: William Dallas Herring

1973

- Literature: Helen Smith Bevington, Burke Davis
- Science: Ellis Cowling
- Fine Arts: Kenneth Ness
- Public Service: Samuel J. Ervin

1974

- Literature: Thad Stem, Jr.
- Science: James Wyngaarden
- Fine Arts: William Fields
- Public Service: Ellen Black Winston

1975

- Literature: Doris Betts
- Science: John Etchells
- Fine Arts: Robert Ward
- Public Service: William Friday

1976

- Literature: Richard Walser
- Science: C. Clark Cockerham
- Fine Arts: Romare Bearden, Foster Fitz-Simons
- Public Service: Juanita Kreps

1977

- Literature: Reynolds Price
- Science: Reginald Mitchiner
- Fine Arts: Joseph Sloane, Jonathan Williams
- Public Service: Elizabeth Duncan Koontz

1978

- Literature: Manly Wade Wellman
- Science: David Sabiston, Jr.
- Fine Arts: Henry Kamphoefner
- Public Service: Robert Garvey, Jr., Harriet Tynes

1979

- Literature: Harry Golden
- Science: Walter Gordy
- Fine Arts: Sam Ragan
- Public Service: Archie Davis, John deButts

=== 1980s ===
1980

- Literature: Fred Chappell
- Science: George Hitchings
- Fine Arts: Robert Lindgren
- Public Service: Dan Moore, Jeanelle Moore

1981

- Literature: Glen Rounds, Tom Wicker
- Science: Vivian Stannett
- Fine Arts: Adeline McCall
- Public Service: Ralph Scott

1982

- Literature: Willie Snow Ethridge
- Science: Floyd Denny, Jr.
- Fine Arts: Selma Burke, R. Philip Hanes, Jr.
- Public Service: Nancy Chase

1983

- Literature: Heather Ross Miller
- Science: Frank Guthrie
- Fine Arts: Mary Keesler Dalton & Harry Lee Dalton
- Public Service: Hugh Morton

1984

- Literature: Joseph Mitchell, Lee Smith
- Science: Robert Hill
- Fine Arts: Maud Gatewood, Andy Griffith
- Public Service: George Watts Hill

1985

- Literature: Wilma Dykeman
- Science: Irwin Fridovich
- Fine Arts: Claude Howell
- Public Service: J. Gordon Hanes, Jr.

1986

- Literature: A.R. Ammons
- Science: Ernest Eliel
- Fine Arts: Doc Watson
- Public Service: Joseph M. Bryan, Billy Graham Emmett McRae

1987

- Literature: Maya Angelou
- Science: Robert Lefkowitz
- Fine Arts: Harvey Littleton
- Public Service: John T. Caldwell, Charles Kuralt

1988

- Literature: Charles Eaton
- Science: Pedro Cuatrecasas
- Fine Arts: Edith London
- Public Service: David Brinkley, William Lee

1989

- Literature: Ronald Bayes
- Science: Gertrude Elion
- Fine Arts: Loonis McGlohon
- Public Service: Roy Park, Maxine Swalin

=== 1990s ===
1990

- Literature: Leon Rooke
- Science: H. Keith H. Brodie
- Fine Arts: Bob Timberlake
- Public Service: Dean Colvard, Frank Kenan

1991

- Literature: Robert Morgan
- Science: Mary Ellen Jones
- Fine Arts: William Brown
- Public Service: Elizabeth Dole, Jesse Meredith

1992

- Literature: Louis D. Rubin, Jr.
- Science: John Madey
- Fine Arts: Chuck Davis
- Public Service: William McWhorter Cochrane, Maxwell Thurman

1993

- Literature: John Hope Franklin
- Science: Oliver Smithies
- Fine Arts: Joe Cox, Billy Taylor
- Public Service: Eric Schopler

1994

- Literature: Elizabeth Spencer
- Science: Marshall Edgell
- Fine Arts: Sarah Blakeslee
- Public Service: Richard Jenrette, Freda Nicholson

1995

- Literature: James Applewhite
- Science: Clyde A. Hutchison, III, John Mayo
- Fine Arts: John Biggers, Kenneth Noland
- Public Service: Banks Talley, Jr.

1996

- Literature: Betty Adcock
- Science: Joseph Pagano
- Fine Arts: Joanne Bath
- Public Service: Martha McKay, John L. Sanders, Robert Scott

1997

- Literature: Clyde Edgerton
- Science: Robert Bruck
- Fine Arts: M. Mellanay Delhom
- Public Service: Thomas Kenan, III, Elna Spaulding

1998

- Literature: Kaye Gibbons
- Science: Martin Rodbell
- Fine Arts: Robert Gray, Marvin Saltzman, James Taylor
- Public Service: Emily Harris Preyer, L. Richardson Preyer

1999

- Literature: Allan Gurganus, Jill McCorkle
- Science: Robert Parr, Knut Schmidt-Nielsen
- Fine Arts: Frank L. Horton, Herb Jackson
- Public Service: Julia Jones Daniels, Frank Daniels, Jr., Henry Shelton

=== 2000s ===
2000

- Literature: William S. Powell
- Science: William Fletcher
- Fine Arts: S. Tucker Cooke
- Public Service: Henry Bowers, Harlan E. Boyles, James Goodmon

2001

- Literature: Kathryn Stripling Byer, Shelby Stephenson
- Science: Royce W. Murray
- Fine Arts: Arthur Smith
- Public Service: W.W. Finlator, Robert Jordan, III

2002

- Literature: Romulus Linney
- Science: William Anlyan
- Fine Arts: Cynthia Bringle, Martha Nell Hardy
- Public Service: Julius L. Chambers, H. G. Jones, Edwin Wilson

2003

- Literature: Jaki Shelton Green
- Science: William E. Thornton
- Fine Arts: Etta Baker, Mary Ann Scherr
- Public Service: Frank Borden Hanes, James B. Hunt, Jr.

2004

- Literature: Walter J. Harrelson, Penelope Niven
- Science: Annie Louise Wilkerson
- Fine Arts: William Ivey Long, Elizabeth Matheson
- Public Service: Voit Gilmore, LeRoy T. Walker

2005

- Literature: Randall Kenan
- Science: Mansukh C. Wani
- Fine Arts: Bland Simpson
- Public Service: Joseph M. Bryan, Jr., Betty Debnam Hunt, Thomas Willis Lambeth

2006

- Literature: Emily Herring Wilson, Michael F. Parker
- Science: Charles A. Sanders
- Fine Arts: William T. Williams
- Public Service: Roy Park, Jr., James E. Holshouser, Jr., Thomas K. Hearn, Jr.

2007

- Literature: William Leuchtenburg
- Science: Viney Aneja, Darrel Stafford
- Fine Arts: Jan Davidson, Rosemary Harris
- Public Service: Jerry C. Cashion, Henry Frye, Burley Mitchell, Charlie Rose

2008

- Literature: Charles Frazier, Margaret Maron
- Science: Maurice Brookhart
- Fine Arts: Gerald Freedman, Alexander M. Rivera Jr.
- Public Service: Ann Goodnight, James G. Martin, Dean Smith, Fred and Alice Stanback

2009

- Literature: Gerald Barrax
- Science: Joseph M. DeSimone
- Fine Arts: Mark Peiser, Bo Thorp
- Public Service: Betty Ray McCain, Hugh L. McColl, Jr.

=== 2010s ===
2010

- Literature: Carole Boston Weatherford
- Science: F. Ivy Carroll
- Fine Arts: Robert Ebendorf, Donald Sultan
- Public Service: R. Michael Leonard, Margaret S. "Tog" Newman

2011

- Literature: Ron Rash
- Science: Trudy Mackay
- Fine Arts: Branford Marsalis, Vollis Simpson
- Public Service: Charles E. Hammer, Jr., H. Martin Lancaster

2012

- Literature: Gary Neil Carden
- Science: B. Jayant Baliga
- Fine Arts: Lou Donaldson, Thomas H. Sayre
- Public Service: Bonnie McElveen-Hunter, Janice Faulkner

2013

- Literature: John Hart
- Science: Myron S. Cohen
- Fine Arts: John Cram
- Public Service: Phil Kirk, John Harding Lucas, Walt Wolfram

2014

- Literature: Lenard Moore, Alan Shapiro
- Science: Jagdish Narayan
- Fine Arts: Ira David Wood III
- Public Service: Betsy M. Bennett, Robert A. Ingram

2015

- Literature: Anthony S. Abbott
- Science: Anthony Atala
- Fine Arts: A. Everette James, Patricia McBride
- Public Service: James T. Broyhill, Howard N. Lee

2016

- Literature: Joseph Bathanti
- Science: Linda Birnbaum, Aziz Sancar, Paul L. Modrich
- Fine Arts: Assad Meymandi
- Public Service: Robert J. Brown, Jim Gardner

2017

- Literature: Margaret Donovan Bauer
- Science: R.K.M. Jayanty
- Fine Arts: Philip Freelon
- Public Service: Loretta E. Lynch, Jane Smith Patterson, James H. Woodward

2018

- Literature: Michael McFee
- Fine Arts: Bill Leslie, Barbara B. Millhouse
- Public Service: Carolyn Q. Coleman, William L. Roper, Gene Roberts

2019

- Literature: Philip Gerard
- Fine Arts: Lawrence J. Wheeler
- Public Service: William J. Barber, W. Earl Britt, Deborah S. Proctor
- Science: Catherine M. Wilfert, M.D.

=== 2020s ===
2020

- Science: Ralph S. Baric, Francis S. Collins, Kizzmekia S. Corbett

2021

- Fine Arts: David Holt
- Literature: André Leon Talley, Timothy B. Tyson
- Public Service: Dudley E. Flood, Maria F. Spaulding
- Science: Blake S. Wilson

2022

- Fine Arts: Eric Church
- Literature: David Zucchino
- Public Service: Eva Clayton, Mickey Michaux
- Science: Priya Kishnani, Stanley Riggs

2025

- Fine Arts: Woody Platt, Buddy Melton
- Literature: Wiley Cash
- Public Service: James Ferguson, Roy Williams
- Science: Kathie Dello

2026

- Fine Arts: Beverly McIver
- Literature: Jason Mott
- Public Service: Richard Petty, Lt. Gen. Kevin Vereen, and Randy Woodson
- Science: Lindsay Zanno

== See also ==
- Order of the Long Leaf Pine

== Works cited ==
- Sanders, John L. (1961). "State Government". Popular Government. Vol. 28, no. 1–2. UNC Institute of Government. pp. 3–8, 69.
