= North Carolina literature =

The literature of North Carolina, USA, includes fiction, poetry, and varieties of nonfiction. Representative authors include playwright Paul Green, short-story writer O. Henry, and novelist Thomas Wolfe.

== History ==
- See Scottish Gaelic literature, Iain mac Mhurchaidh

A printing press began operating in New Bern, at the time North Carolina's capital, in 1749.

"The first book published by a black in the South was The Hope of Liberty (1829), which contained poems decrying the slaves' condition, by George Moses Horton of North Carolina." Harriet Jacobs (1813–1897) "details events of slave life in Edenton" in her 1861 autobiographical Incidents in the Life of a Slave Girl.

== Organizations ==
The North Carolina Literary and Historical Association began in 1900 in Raleigh, and the North Carolina Poetry Society in 1932 in Charlotte. The North Carolina Writers' Network formed in 1985, and the Winston-Salem Writers group in 2005.

=== North Carolina Literary Hall of Fame ===
The "North Carolina Literary Hall of Fame" (est.1996) resides in the James Boyd House in the town of Southern Pines. Inductees:

- Anthony S. Abbott (2020)
- A.R. Ammons
- Allan Gurganus
- Bernice Kelly Harris
- Betty Adcock
- Bland Simpson
- Burke Davis
- Carl Sandburg
- Carole Boston Weatherford
- Charles Chesnutt
- Charles Frazier
- Christian Reid
- Clyde Edgerton
- Doris Betts
- Elizabeth Daniels Squire
- Elizabeth Spencer
- Frances Gray Patton
- Fred Chappell
- George Moses Horton
- Gerald Barrax
- Gerald Johnson
- Glen Rounds
- Guy Owen
- Harriet Jacobs
- Helen Bevington
- Inglis Fletcher
- Jaki Shelton Green
- James Applewhite
- James Boyd
- James W. Clark Jr.
- James Ephraim McGirt
- Jill McCorkle
- John Charles McNeill
- John Ehle
- John Hope Franklin
- John Lawson
- Jonathan Williams
- Jonathan Worth Daniels
- Joseph Mitchell
- Kathryn Stripling Byer
- Lee Smith
- Louis D. Rubin, Jr.
- Manly Wade Wellman
- Margaret Maron
- Marsha White Warren
- Max Steele
- Maya Angelou
- Olive Tilford Dargan
- Paul Green
- Pauli Murray
- Penelope Niven
- Randall Jarrell
- Randall Kenan
- Reynolds Price
- Richard Walser
- Robert Morgan
- Robert Ruark
- Ronald H. Bayes
- Sam Ragan
- Samm-Art Williams
- Shelby Stephenson
- Thad Stem, Jr.
- Thomas Wolfe
- Tom Wicker
- Walter Hines Page
- Wilbur J. Cash
- William LeGette Blythe
- William S. Powell
- William Sydney Porter, known as O. Henry
- Wilma Dykeman

== Awards and events ==
In 1948 Arthur Talmage Abernethy became the first North Carolina Poet Laureate.

== See also ==
- Category:Writers from North Carolina
- List of newspapers in North Carolina
- Category:North Carolina in fiction
- Category:Libraries in North Carolina
- Southern United States literature
- American literary regionalism

== Bibliography ==
- Lucian Lamar Knight, ed. (1913). "Fifty Reading Courses: North Carolina". Library of Southern Literature. Vol. 16. Atlanta: Martin and Hoyt Company. p. 204+. hdl:2027/uc1.31175034925258 – via HathiTrust.
- Library, North Carolina State (1919), "Bibliography of North Carolina", Biennial Report of the State Librarian of North Carolina, pp. 23–80. (Works by North Carolinans or related to the state)
- Elsie Dershem (1921). "North Carolina". Outline of American State Literature. Lawrence, Kansas: World Company – via Internet Archive.
- Federal Writers’ Project (1939). "The Arts: Literature". North Carolina: a Guide to the Old North State. American Guide Series. Chapel Hill: University of North Carolina Press. pp. 107–111.
- G. Thomas Tanselle (1971). Guide to the Study of United States Imprints. Harvard University Press. ISBN 978-0-674-36761-6. (Includes information about North Carolina literature)
- Joseph M. Flora; Lucinda Hardwick MacKethan, eds. (2001). "Literature of North Carolina". Companion to Southern Literature: Themes, Genres, Places, People, Movements, and Motifs. Louisiana State University Press. p. 557. ISBN 978-0-8071-2692-9.
- William L. Andrews, ed. (2006). North Carolina Roots of African American Literature: An Anthology. University of North Carolina Press. ISBN 978-0-8078-2994-3.. (Includes examples of work by Charles W. Chesnutt, Anna J. Cooper, George Moses Horton, Harriet Ann Jacobs, Moses Roper, David Walker)
- Sally Buckner (Fall 2009), "North Carolina Literature", Tar Heel Junior Historian, Tar Heel Junior Historian Association, North Carolina Museum of History – via NCpedia
- Anne Bridges; Russell Clement; Ken Wise (2014). "Literature of the Great Smoky Mountains". Terra Incognita: an Annotated Bibliography of the Great Smoky Mountains, 1544-1934. Knoxville, TN: University of Tennessee Press. pp. 223–262. ISBN 978-1-62190-014-6.
