= McGirt =

McGirt is a surname. Notable people with the surname include:

- Buddy McGirt (born 1964), American boxing trainer and retired boxer
- Daniel McGirt (c. 1750–1804), American outlaw and soldier
- Dan McGirt (born 1967), American comic fantasy author
- Eddie McGirt (1920–1999), American football and basketball coach
- James Ephraim McGirt (1874–1930), American poet, publisher, and businessman
- William McGirt (born 1979), American professional golfer

== See also ==
- Dirt McGirt, a stage name used by American rapper Ol' Dirty Bastard
- McGirt v. Oklahoma, a 2020 United States Supreme Court case
