= Octet (Christensen) =

Octet is a ballet made on New York City Ballet by Willam Christensen to Stravinsky's Octet for Wind Instruments (1922–23). The premiere took place December 2, 1958, at the City Center of Music and Drama.

== Original cast ==
- Barbara Walczak
- Edward Villella
- Dido Sayers
- William Weslow
- Roberta Lubell
- Robert Lindgren
- Judith Green
- Richard Rapp

== Reviews ==
- NY Times by John Martin, December 3, 1958
