= Bob Timberlake =

Bob Timberlake may refer to:

- Bob Timberlake (American football) (born 1943), American football player
- Bob Timberlake (artist) (born 1937), North Carolina painter, artist and designer of clothing and furniture
