= Fairy houses =

Small outdoor structures intended to look like residences for fairies

Fairy houses are small outdoor structures intended to look like residences for fairies. Creators often choose natural, foraged materials to build and decorate their houses, allowing the creations to decompose back into the ground where they are placed.

Fairy house building has been touted as a way to encourage children to spend time in nature and to exercise their imaginations. However, fairy house creation has also been championed by adult creators as well, some of whom build elaborate or longer-lasting structures.

== Origins ==
Fairy houses have been recorded on Monhegan Island in Maine since the 1950s, although some claim they date back to the early 20th century. These houses were primarily made by local children.

In the early 2000s, New Hampshire writer Tracy Kane began publishing children's books on fairy houses after visiting Monhegan. Kane has been credited with the popularization of fairy houses outside of Maine.

By the mid-2000s, Portsmouth, New Hampshire, began organizing the Annual Fairy House Tour, which as of 2012 was one of the largest fairy house events in the world.

== Materials ==
Many fairy house creators suggest that natural materials be used in their construction. Depending on the region, this can include logs and twigs, acorns and pinecones, grasses, shells, feathers, stones, or produce such as berries and pumpkins. Some will go further and specify that fairy house creators should not disturb living plants while gathering materials for their creations.

== Fairy House trails ==
Some artists and communities have contributed fairy houses to specific trails or paths. Although some of these communal exhibits are temporary, others are permanent installations.

Country	State	City / Town	Park or trail name	Date established	Ref
United States	Alaska	Anchorage	Russian Jack Park	2023	
United States	New Jersey	Millburn	South Mountain Fairy Trail	2011	
United States	New York	Henrietta	Tinker Nature Park	2014-2019	
United States	New York	Rochester	Mendon Ponds Park	2019	
United States	North Carolina	Raleigh	Annie Louise Wilkerson, M.D. Nature Preserve Park		
United States	Maine	Falmouth	Mackworth Island State Park		

== Environmental impact ==
Some environmentalists worry that the creation of fairy houses contributes to the destruction of local environments, as creators may harvest plants, including slow-growing plants like mosses or lichens, for decorative or structural uses. Other critics are concerned that fairy houses may be made out of non-compostable or artificial materials, leading to plastic, glass, and other pollutants being introduced to natural spaces.

Fairy house trails may also have a negative impact on natural spaces, as increased visitors to an area can result in vandalism, littering, soil compaction and erosion, and destruction of plant life.

== Gallery ==
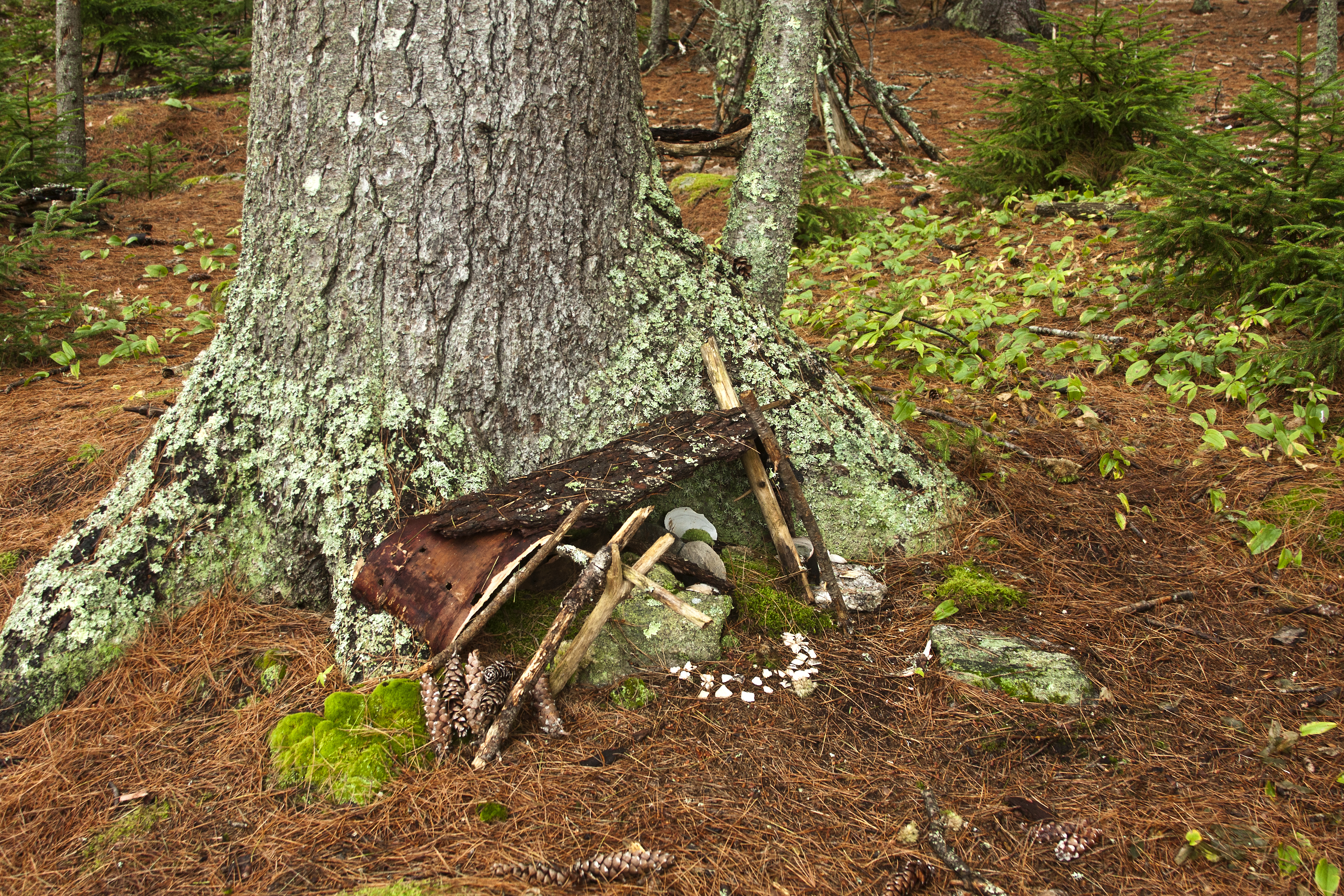
A fairy house in the Coastal Maine Botanical Garden

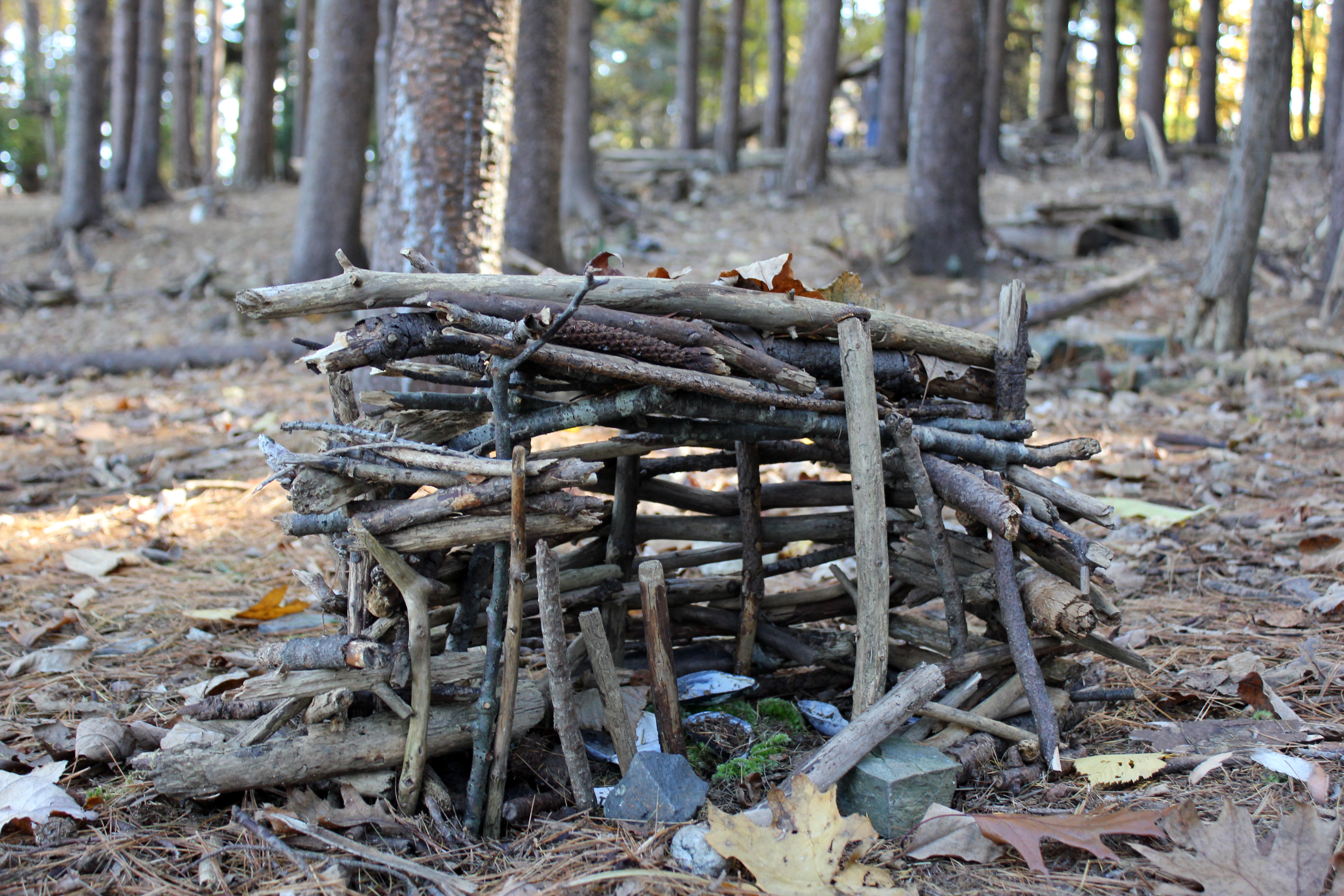

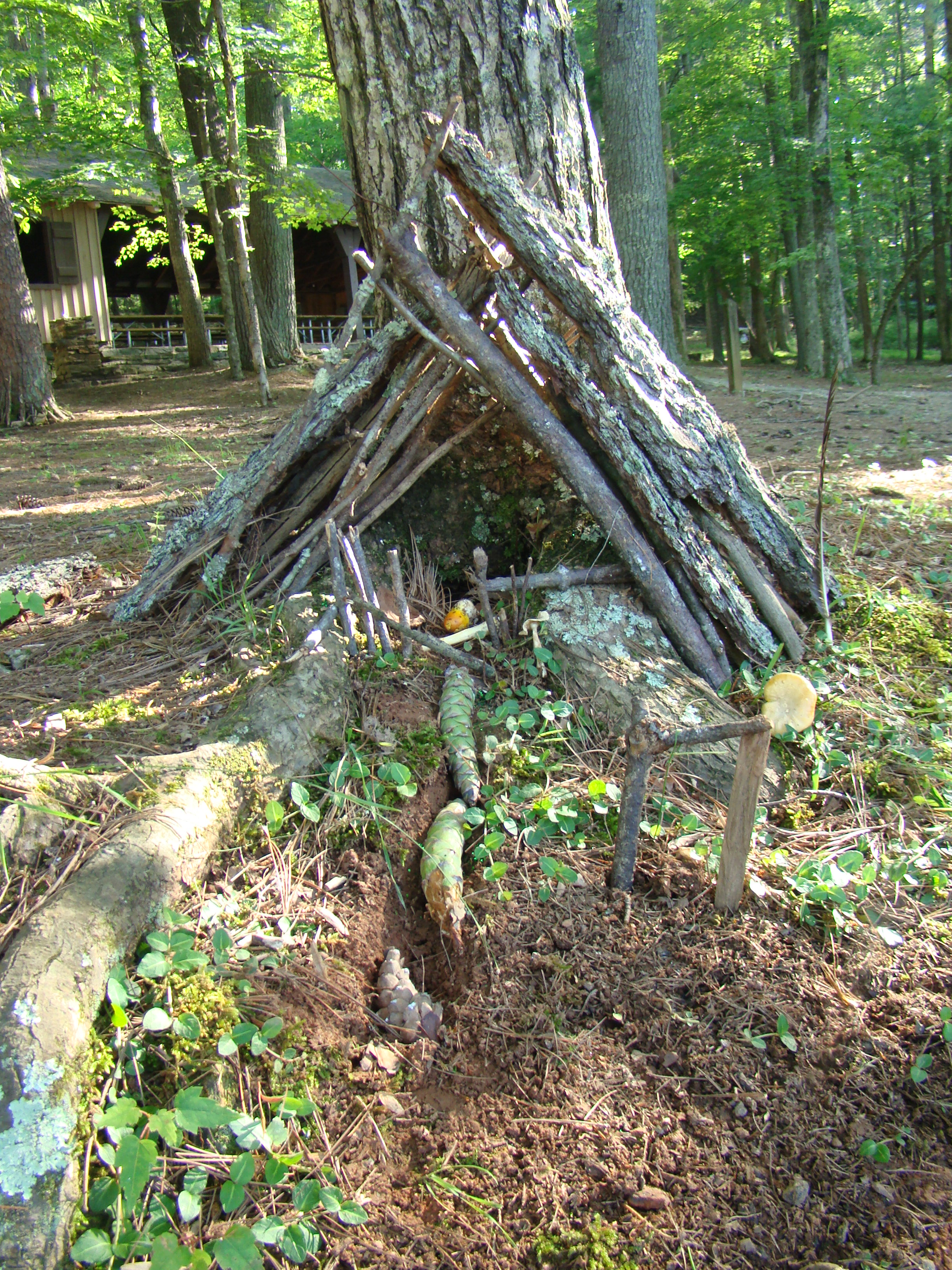
