= East Liberty =

East Liberty may refer to:

- East Liberty, Indiana
- East Liberty, Ohio
- East Liberty (Pittsburgh), a neighborhood of Pittsburgh
- East Liberty (novel), a novel by Joseph Bathanti set in the Pittsburgh neighborhood of the same name
