= Salem College Center for Women Writers =

The Center for Women Writers is a literary arts organization based at Salem College in Winston-Salem, North Carolina. The Center for Women Writers was established in 1996, which coincided with the 225th anniversary of the opening of Salem Academy & College. The first director was Annette Allen. In addition to hosting literary arts events, the Center for Women Writers underwrites an annual January Term Writer-in-Residence and manages the International Literary Awards, initially called the National Literary Awards. These awards include the Reynolds Price Short Fiction Award, Rita Dove Poetry Award, and the Penelope Niven Creative Nonfiction Award.

== Past winners ==
=== Short fiction ===
- 2003 - Sheryl Monks
- 2004 - Jennifer S. Davis
- 2007 - Bonnie Jo Campbell
- 2008 - Becky Hagenston
- 2009 - Jacob Appel
- 2011 - Colette Sartor
- 2013 - T.D. Storm
- 2014 - Bushra Rehman
- 2015 - Kerry Hill
- 2016 - JoeAnne Hart
- 2017 - Jaquira Díaz
- 2018 - Kristen Gentry
- 2019- Elizabeth Edelglass
- 2020- Kanza Javed

=== Poetry ===
- 2004 - Ann Fisher-Wirth
- 2007 - Mary F. Morris
- 2008 - Terry Godbey
- 2009 - Susan Lilley
- 2010 -
- 2011 - Susan A. Cohen
- 2012 -
- 2013 -
- 2014 - Joseph Bathanti
- 2015 - Jaimie Gusman
- 2016 - J.C. Todd
- 2017 - Danielle Zaccagnino
- 2018 - Annie Virginia
- 2019 - Laura Minor
- 2020 - Chelsea Bunn

=== Nonfiction ===
- 2003 - Maureen Stanton
- 2004 - Catherine Rainwater
- 2007 - M.B. McLatchey
- 2008 - Pascha A. Stevenson
- 2009 - Maria Hummel
- 2010 -
- 2011 - Mako Yoshikawa
- 2012 - Jennifer Rose
- 2013 -
- 2014 - Brandel France de Bravo
- 2015 - Melissa Febos
- 2016 - Jessica Reidy
- 2017 - Lisa Locascio
- 2018 - Eliza Smith
- 2019 - Jen Soriano
- 2020 - Maria Isabelle Carlos

== See also ==
- List of American literary awards
- List of literary awards
