= Bernice Kelly Harris =

American novelist and playwright (1891–1973)

Bernice Kelley Harris
- Born: October 8, 1891 Wake County, North Carolina
- Died: September 13, 1973 (aged 81) Durham, North Carolina
- Period: 1939–1971

Bernice Kelly Harris (October 8, 1891 – September 13, 1973) was an American novelist and playwright from North Carolina. She participated in the Federal Writers' Project of the Works Progress Administration, during which she collected biographies of people in the Southern United States.

Harris published seven novels between 1939 and 1951, including Purslane (1939), Sweet Beulah Land (1943), and Janey Jeems (1946). Her work often featured characters living in the American South, especially in eastern North Carolina.

== Early life and education ==
Harris was born in Wake County, North Carolina on October 8, 1891, to farmers William Haywood and Rosa Poole Kelly. She was one of six or seven children. Her family attended Mt. Moriah Baptist Church, and she was educated at the Mt. Moriah Academy. Harris also attended Cary High School for one year and graduated from Meredith College in 1913.

== Career ==
Harris briefly worked as a school principal in Beulaville, North Carolina before becoming a teacher at the South Fork Institute in Catwaba County. She then worked as an English teacher at Seaboard High School in Northampton County from 1917 to 1927.

In 1919 and 1920, Harris studied playwrighting at the University of North Carolina under Frederick H. Koch.

After 1930, Harris began writing human interest stories in newspapers in Norfolk and Raleigh. Four of these stories were included in These Are Our Lives (1939), a collection of biographical sketches of people living in the Southern United States during the Great Depression, published by the Federal Writers' Project of the Works Progress Administration.

In 1939, Harris published her first novel, Purslane, at the encouragement of journalist Jonathan Worth Daniels. It was the first novel ever published by the University of North Carolina Press. Purslane received critical acclaim and earned the Mayflower Cup of the North Carolina Literary and Historical Association. Portulaca, the sequel to Purslane, was published in 1941. She continued to publish books regularly through the early 1950s.

Folk Plays of Eastern Carolina, a collection of one-act plays by Harris, was published in 1940. Sweet Beulah Land (1943) was reviewed positively by Eudora Welty for The New York Times Book Review.

Her 1946 novel Janey Jeems, which features an African American protagonist, was reportedly inspired by two black women whom she employed as domestic workers. Her 1948 novel Hearthstones tells the story of a Confederate Army deserter, his family, and their descendants in the Roanoke region of Virginia.

In 1961, Harris served as president of the North Carolina Literary and Historical Association. Beginning in 1963, she taught creative writing at Chowan College.

=== Bibliography ===
- Purslane (1939)
- Folks Plays of Eastern Carolina (1940)
- Portulaca (1941)
- Sweet Beulah Land (1943)
- Sage Quarter (1945)
- Janey Jeems (1946)
- Hearthstones (1948)
- Wild Cherry Tree Road (1951)
- Southern Home Remedies (1968)
- Strange Things Happen (1971)

=== Awards and honors ===
In 1959, Harris received an honorary Doctor of Literature degree from Wake Forest University, and the following year, the University of North Carolina at Greensboro also presented her with an honorary doctorate. Harris was given a North Carolina Award during 1966.

Harris posthumously received a Brown-Hudson Folklore Award from the North Carolina Folklore Society for Southern Home Remedies (1968) and Strange Things Happen (1971). She joined the North Carolina Literary Hall of Fame in 1996.

== Private life ==
Harris married Herbert Kavanaugh Harris, a Seabord, North Carolina farmer, in May 1926. Herbert Harris died on July 13, 1950, at the age of 66. During their marriage, Herbert reportedly controlled all of the profits Bernice earned through the sale of her books, leaving little to his wife after his death. However, reviews of Harris' books published after Herbert's death describe the marriage as "happy."

Harris was a member of the Democratic Party.

== Death and legacy ==
Harris died in Durham, North Carolina on September 13, 1973, at the age of 81.

On June 26, 1976, the Roanoke-Chowan Group established the Bernice Kelly Harris Memorial Scholarship in English and creative writing at Chowan College.

The public exhibited a renewed interest in Harris' work in the early 2000s, with Valerie Raleigh Yow publishing a biography of Harris, titled Bernice Kelly Harris: A Good Life Writing, with Louisiana State University Press in 2000.
