= Nicholas Rudall =

Welsh classicist (1940–2018)

D. Nicholas Rudall (1940, in Llanelli, Wales – 19 June 2018) was a Welsh professor of classical languages and literature as well as humanities and Ancient Mediterranean history at the University of Chicago. He specialized in Greek drama, and translated numerous works by Sophocles, Euripides, and Aristophanes. His translations and adaptations are published by Ivan R. Dee of Chicago, for whom he was co-editor of the Plays for Performance Series with longtime friend and colleague Bernard Sahlins. Among undergraduates, Rudall is known particularly for his work with prominent Shakespearean David Bevington, with whom he created and co-taught a two-quarter sequence entitled "History and Theory of Drama".

Rudall was the founding director of the Court Theatre in Chicago, where he transformed the school's amateur outdoor summer theater into a multi-million-dollar professional theater focused on classic work. He led the institution for 23 years (1961-1994).

Rudall died on 19 June 2018 at age 78 from complications with colon and liver cancer.

== Filmography ==
Year	Title	Role	Notes
1992	The Babe	Brother Malcolm	
1996	Chain Reaction	Dr. Alistair Barkley	
2007	Crime Fiction	Male Professor	(final film role)
