= Elizabeth Matheson (photographer) =

American photographer

- Born: 1942 (age 83–84); Hillsborough, North Carolina
- Education: Sweet Briar College, Penland School of Crafts
- Known for: Photography

Elizabeth Matheson (born 1942) is a prominent photographer in North Carolina.

== Early life and education ==
Elizabeth Matheson was born in Hillsborough, North Carolina. She earned a bachelor's degree from Sweet Briar College in 1964 before attending the Penland School of Crafts, working under John Menapace and completing her studies in 1972.

== Career ==
Matheson has won many awards for her photography, including the North Carolina Award for Excellence in the Arts. She primarily photographs interiors, but her subjects range widely. She has held solo exhibitions of her work at Hollins University, the Virginia Polytechnic Institute, the North Carolina Museum of Art, Duke University, and others.

Her work has been featured in publications including Quartet: Four North Carolina Photographers, Safe Harbor Books, 2005; To See, poems by Michael McFee, North Carolina Wesleyan Press, 1991; Blithe Air: Photographs of England, Wales, and Ireland, Jargon Society, 1995; and Shell Castle, Portrait of a North Carolina House, Safe Harbor Books, 2008.
