= Anthony S. Abbott =

American professor and writer (1935–2020)

Anthony "Tony" S. Abbott
- Born: January 7, 1935; San Francisco, California, U.S.
- Died: October 3, 2020 (aged 85)
- Occupations: professor, writer
- Years active: 1959-

Anthony "Tony" S. Abbott was an American college professor and writer. He taught at Davidson College for over 41 years. He received the North Carolina Award for Literature in 2015, the highest award bestowed to a civilian by the State of North Carolina. In November 2018, the Town of Davison, North Carolina awarded him the G. Jackson Burney Community Service Award. In 2020, he was inducted into the North Carolina Literary Hall of Fame.

== Early life and education ==
Abbott was born on January 7, 1935, in San Francisco, California. He graduated from Princeton University in 1957, and received a masters (1960) and doctorate (1962) degree at Harvard University.

== Career ==
He taught at Bates College from 1961 to 1964. In 1964, he started teaching English at Davidson College and eventually became the Charles A. Dana Professor of English Emeritus. Davidson College recognized him with the Thomas Jefferson Award in 1969 and the Hunter-Hamilton Love of Teaching Award in 1997.

He authored two novels and six books of poetry. The book of poetry The Girl in the Yellow Raincoat received a Pulitzer Prize nomination. He was the recipient of the Sam Ragan Awards in 1996 and the Brockman-Campbell Award from the North Carolina Poetry Society in 2012. He served as the President of the North Carolina Writers Network and the Chairmen of the North Carolina Writers Conference.
