= South Mountain Fairy Trail =

Hiking path in Millburn, New Jersey

Coordinates: 40.7275°N 74.3044°W

The South Mountain Fairy Trail is a half-mile hiking path in the South Mountain Reservation in Millburn, New Jersey, named as such due to the many miniature "fairy houses" along the path. The trail is part of the mile-long Rahway Trail.

== History ==
The South Mountain Fairy Trail was started by New Jersey artist Therese Ojibway in 2011. Ojibway began building fairy houses for the South Mountain Reservation's Rahway Trail in hopes of creating a safe outdoor space for her young autistic son to be able to visit. After placing the initial structures on her own, the South Mountain Conservancy gave Ojibway official permission to continue the project. Ojibway did so, creating around 30 fairy houses by 2015.

Around 2016, visitors to the trail began leaving their own structures, some of which were "crude" or made of plastic. Ojibway, in response, erected a sign on one of the houses, declaring that "Fairies Like: Acorns, pine cones, shells, flowers and pretty stones. Not plastic". The Conservancy was also displeased with the new structures, feeling that it violated the "take nothing, leave nothing" approach to the outdoors which the Conservancy attempted to promote. They ultimately erected their own sign, asking visitors to only leave fairy houses made of natural materials.

The trail attracted many visitors during the COVID-19 pandemic, as an outdoor kid-friendly activity. The increase in visitors led to soil compaction and erosion on the path, and destruction of plant life along the path.

Since 2022, the trail has been upkept by Julie Gould and Beth Kelly. In 2023, the trail hosted its first annual Fairy Day.

== Trail ==
The half-mile path is fairly flat, and is bordered with a rope fence to discourage hikers from trampling surrounding plant life.

The approximately 80 fairy houses on the trail are made and repaired by volunteers. Trailkeepers encourage house creators to use natural materials that can decompose in the forest, and muted, natural colors. Visitors are asked not to disturb the existing structures or to add their own.

As of 2024, the South Mountain Conservancy has proposed a plan to improve the trail by adding benches and a covered pavilion.
