= Jagdish Narayan =

Indian-born American engineer

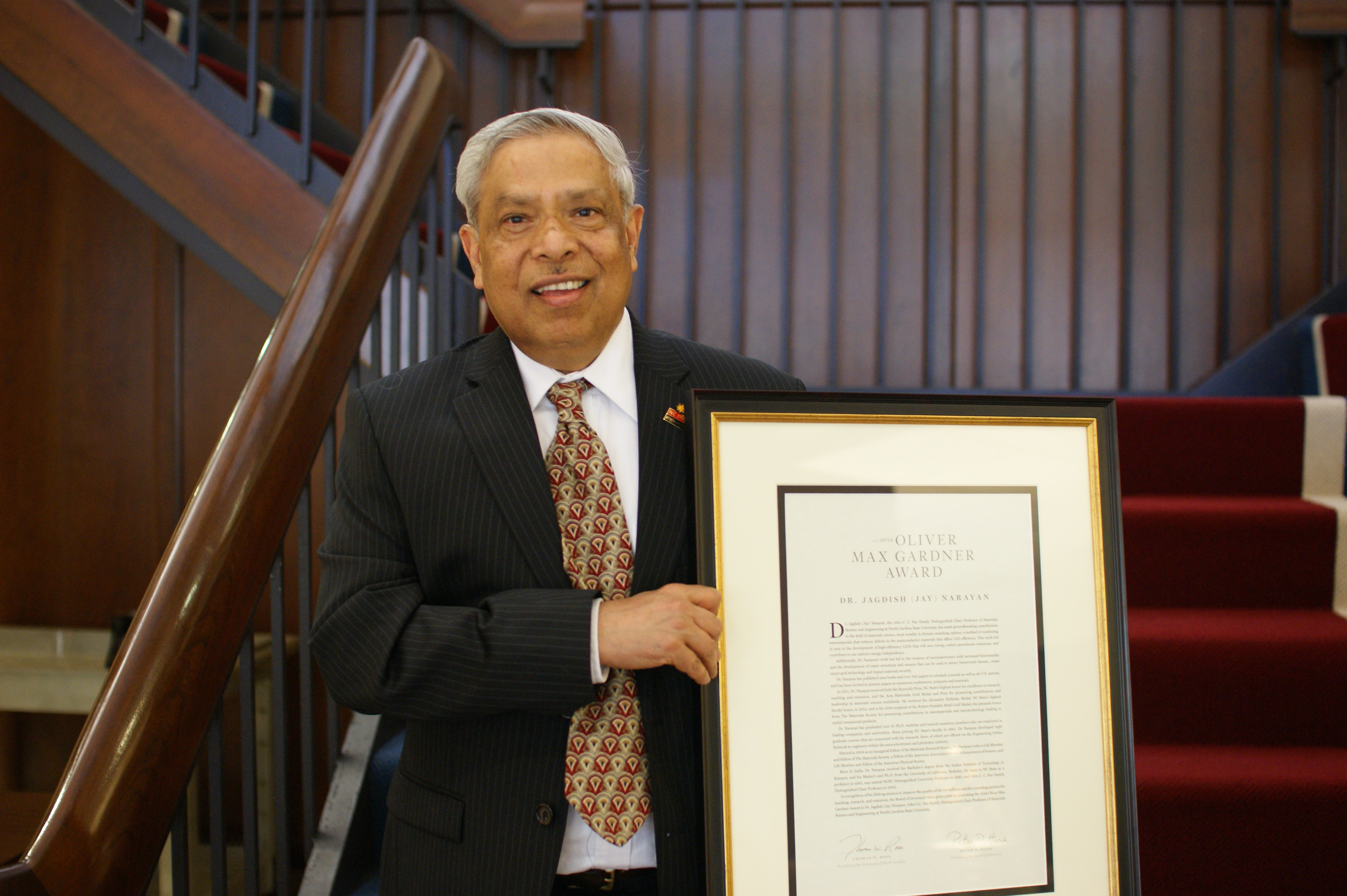
- Born: Kanpur, India
- Other names: Jay Narayan
- Citizenship: United States
- Occupation: Professor
- Employer: North Carolina State University
- Known for: Q-carbon, Domain matching epitaxy, Laser annealing
- Children: 1

Jagdish Narayan is an Indian-born American engineer. Since 2001, he has been the John C. C. Fan Family Distinguished Chair Professor in the Materials Science and Engineering Department at North Carolina State University. Narayan has co-authored over 500 publications and is listed as a co-inventor on over 40 US and international patents. He has conducted research on non-equilibrium laser processing of novel nanomaterials, including Q-carbon, Q-BN, diamond and c-BN related materials.

== Early life and education ==
Narayan moved to the United States in 1969 from India. After completion of his bachelor's degree (with distinction and honors) from IIT Kanpur, India, he joined UC Berkeley in 1969 and completed his MS (1970) and PhD (1971) in materials science and engineering.

== Professional career ==
After finishing his PhD, Narayan served as a research metallurgist at the Lawrence Berkeley National Laboratory from 1971 to 1972. He later joined Oak Ridge National Laboratory, where he retired as a senior scientist and group leader of the Thin Films and Electron Microscopy Group (1972–84). In 1984, he joined the North Carolina State University as NC Microelectronics Professor and director of the Microelectronics Center of North Carolina. He was appointed as a Distinguished University Professor in 1989. In 2001, he was appointed as the John C. Fan Distinguished Chair Professor. He was also the director of the Division of Materials Research (DMR) of US National Foundation (1990–92). He received the NSF's Distinguished Service Award.

== Research ==
He has conducted research on nanosecond laser annealing, laser-solid interactions, transient thermal processing of nanomaterials and epitaxial thin films. He has contributed to the fields of pulsed laser deposition and epitaxial growth of thin-films. He has contributed to epitaxial growth mechanisms of lattice mismatched films.

His research group at NC State focuses on the controlled fabrication and processing of novel nanomaterials utilizing the pulsed laser deposition using PLD and Laser MBE units, thermal processing of materials using nanosecond laser annealing and generating new epitaxial heterostructures across the misfit scale, utilizing domain matching epitaxy.

== Honors and awards ==
- National Academy of Engineering, 2017
- National Academy of Inventors Fellow, 2014
- North Carolina Science Award, 2014
- O. Max Gardner Award, 2014
- The Minerals, Metals & Materials Society RF Mehl Gold Medal, 2014
- Acta Materialia Gold Medal, 2011
- RJ Reynolds Prize, 2011
- Alexander Quarles Holladay Medal, 2012
- ASM Gold Medal, 1999
