= Sam Ragan Awards =

Annual fine arts award

The Sam Ragan Awards are an annual fine arts award presented by St. Andrews University in Laurinburg, North Carolina. The award honors Sam Ragan who was a North Carolina Poet Laureate and North Carolina's first Secretary of Cultural Resources. It is presented annually for "outstanding contributions to the Fine Arts of North Carolina over an extended period--including, but above and beyond--the recipient's own primary commitment."

== Sam Ragan Fine Arts Award Winners ==
Listed below are the recipients of The Sam Ragan Fine Arts Award.

1981
- Sara Hodgkins, Southern Pines, NC

1982

- Harriet Doar, Charlotte, NC
- John Fries Blair, Winston-Salem, NC

1983

- Nicholas Bragg, Winston-Salem, NC
- Roy Parker, Fayetteville, NC

1984

- Mae Woods Bell, Rocky Mount, NC
- Frank Borden Hanes, Winston-Salem, NC

1985

- Charleen Swansea, Chapel Hill, NC
- Ella Fountain Pratt, Durham, NC

1986

- Sallie Nixon, Lincolnton, NC
- James L. Morgan, Laurel Hill, NC

1987

- Robert Mason, Southern Pines, NC
- A. P. Perkinson, Pinehurst, NC

1988

- Paul Jeffery, Durham, NC

1989

- Shelby Stephenson, Southern Pines, NC
- Stephen Smith, Southern Pines, NC

1990

- William Little, Chapel Hill, NC
- Kate Blackburn, Washington, DC

1991

- Gerald Barrax, Raleigh, NC
- Marsha Warren, Chapel Hill, NC

1992

- Clyde Edgerton, Durham, NC
- Marvin Swartzman, Chapel Hill, NC

1993

- Mary Duke Biddle Trent Semans, Durham, NC
- Marty Silverthorne, Greenville, NC
- Sally Buckner, Raleigh, NC

1994

- Marie Gilbert, Greensboro, NC
- Kathry B. Gurkin, Clinton, NC
- Thomas F. Henley, New York & Laurinburg, NC

1995

- Joseph Bathanti, Statesville, NC
- Nancy Bradberry, Southern Pines, NC
- Glen Rounds, Southern Pines, NC

1996

- Anthony S. Abbott, Davidson, NC
- Ruth Moose, Albemarle, NC
- Talmadge Moose, Albemarle, NC

1997

- Jerry Bledsoe, Asheboro, NC
- David Brinkley, Washington, DC
- Ellen Johnson-Hale, Chapel Hill, NC
- Susan Rose, Durham, NC

1998

- Betty Adcock, Raleigh, NC
- Irwin Kremen, Durham, NC
- Tom Wicker, Rochester, VT

1999

- Georgann Eubanks, Chapel Hill, NC
- Jacques Maloubier, Southern Pines, NC
- Loonis McGlohon, Charlotte, NC

2000

- Scott Ainslie, Durham, NC
- Daniel Nie, Washington, DC
- Louis Rubin, Chapel Hill, NC

2001

- Daniel Infantino, Southern Pines, NC
- Dannye Romine Powell, Charlotte, NC
- H. A. Sieber, Greensboro, NC

2002

- Fred Chappell, Greensboro, NC
- Jack Pinkerton, Fayetteville, NC
- James L. Morgan, Jr., Laurinburg, NC

2003

- Edward R. Gomez, New York City, NY

2004

- John Shelby Spong, Morris Plains, NJ

2005

- Chuck Sullivan, Charlotte, NC

2006

- Jan Hensley, Greensboro, NC
- Lenard Moore, Mt. Olive, NC
- Margaret Vardell Sandresky, Winston-Salem, NC

2007

- Robert Gant, Charleston, SC
- Jaki Shelton Green, Mebane, NC
- Sondra Martin, Fayetteville, NC

2008

- Charles Blackburn, Jr., Raleigh, NC
- Barbara Geer, Winston-Salem, NC
- Thomas Sayre, Raleigh, NC

2009

- Thomas Heffernan
- Lois Holt
- Martha Blue Hooks
- Sally Ann Morris, Winston-Salem, NC

2010

- Mary Louise Bringle, Brevard, NC
- Arthur McDonald
- David Rigsbee

2011

- John Holloway
