= Thad Stem Jr. =

American poet

Thaddeus Stem Jr.
- Born: January 24, 1916; Oxford, North Carolina
- Died: June 1, 1980 (aged 64); Oxford, North Carolina
- Occupations: Poet; columnist; author; essayist
- Writing career
- Notable awards: North Carolina Award

Thaddeus Stem Jr. (1916–1980) of Oxford, North Carolina was an American poet, author and newspaper columnist. His work frequently was published in the Raleigh News & Observer and The Pilot (Southern Pines, N.C.). He also wrote or co-wrote 16 books. The major works included The Animal Fair (1960), Entries from Oxford (1971), Senator Sam Ervin's Best Stories (1973), and Thad Stem's Ark (1979). He was honored with the North Carolina Award for Literature in 1974.

== Biography ==
Stem was born in Oxford, North Carolina to, and lived all his life in his first house. He attended local schools, which were then segregated. He went to college at Duke University, but left during his fourth year when still several credits away from earning his degree.

In his early adult years, Stem worked in a variety of jobs. He served in the Army during World War II. He began writing poetry in about 1944, and in 1945, nine of his poems were published in Lyric, a literary magazine published in Roanoke, Virginia. He continued to write sporadically for the next few years until his marriage in 1947.

Between 1949 and 1950, Stem published much work, including: two collections of poetry, one collection of essays, and The Animal Fair, a series of poetic sketches about small-town life. He also sold an estimated 8,000 short pieces to North Carolina newspapers, primarily the Raleigh News and Observer and The Pilot. He wrote a weekly column that eventually became a daily editorial. He published eleven more books over the next two decades.

Stem suffered from kidney failure during the last two years of his life, which required weekly dialysis. He continued to produce articles, short stories, and editorials up until his death. He also compiled Thad Stem's Ark, another collection of his work. He was working on a history of Johnston County, North Carolina at the time of his death.

== Thad Stem Papers ==
The Wilson Library at the University of North Carolina at Chapel Hill houses a collection that contains Stem's correspondence and literary materials. Included among his correspondence are letters with Jonathan Daniels, Paul Green, and Sam Ragan. The writings in the collection include typescript drafts and proofs of much of Stem's work. There are also drafts of an unpublished novel and an incomplete history of Johnston County.

== Works ==
- The Jackknife Horse. Raleigh: Wolf's Head Press, 1954.
- The Perennial Almanac. Charlotte: Heritage House, 1959.
- The Animal Fair. Charlotte: McNally. 1960.
- Penny Whistles and Wild Plums. Charlotte: McNally and Loftin, 1962.
- Light and Rest. Charlotte: McNally and Loftin, 1964.
- Spur Line. Charlotte: McNally and Loftin, 1966.
- A Flagstone Walk. Charlotte: McNally and Loftin, 1968.
- PTA Impact: 50 Years in North Carolina. 1919–1969. Raleigh: North Carolina Congress of Parents and Teachers, 1969.
- Journey Proud. Charlotte: McNally and Loftin, 1970.
- Entries from Oxford. Durham: Moore Publishing Co., 1971.
- Senator Sam Ervin's Best Stories. With Alan Butler. Durham: Moore Publishing Co., 1973.
- Tar Heel Press. Southport: North Carolina Press Association, 1973.
- Thad Stem's First Reader. Durham: Moore Publishing Co., 1976
- Ransacking Words and Customs, from A to Izzard. Durham: Moore Publishing Co., 1977.
- Thad Stem's Ark. Durham. N.C. Moore Publishing Co., 1979.
- In the Beginning. With Sam Ragan. Tryon. N.C.: Gallopade Publishing Group, 1984.

== Representation in other media ==
- Timothy B. Tyson referred to Stem in his memoir Blood Done Sign My Name (2004).
