= John Lucas (educator) =

American educator (1920–2025)

John Harding Lucas

President of Shaw University
- In office September 1986 – July 1987
- Preceded by: Stanley Hugh Smith
- Succeeded by: Talbert O. Shaw

Personal details
- Born: John Harding Lucas; November 7, 1920 Rocky Mount, North Carolina, U.S.
- Died: March 31, 2025 (aged 104)
- Occupation: Academic and university administrator

John Harding Lucas (November 7, 1920 – March 31, 2025) was an American educator and university administrator. He served as president of Shaw University and was instrumental in founding the North Carolina Association of Educators (NCAE).

== Early life and career ==
An alumnus of Shaw University and a World War II veteran who served in the Asiatic-Pacific theater, Lucas began his career as an elementary school and high school teacher, subsequently serving as principal of Orange Street Elementary and Mary Potter School in the town of Oxford. He served as principal of Hillside High School in Durham, North Carolina from 1962 to 1985.

From 1961 to 1972, Lucas headed the North Carolina chapter of the National Education Association (NEA), and following the era of segregation, was instrumental in forming a new statewide educators' association from the White N. C. Education Association and the Black N C. Teachers' Association. His proposal that a completely new professional organization be developed, which came to be known as the "Lucas concept," resulted in the 1970 creation of the North Carolina Association of Educators (NCAE). He later served as the NCAE's fourth president. As a member of the board of trustees of Shaw University, he was appointed the university's interim president on September 16, 1986, and during the following year oversaw the university's recovery from a severe financial crisis.

== Personal life and recognition ==
Lucas was the father of professional basketball and tennis player and coach John Lucas II, and was the grandfather of professional basketball players and coaches John Lucas III and Jai Lucas.

John Lucas died on March 31, 2025, at the age of 104.

== Awards and recognition ==
Lucas was awarded the Trenholm Memorial Award of the National Education Association for state-level and national-level educational leadership in July 2000. In 2012, a Durham public middle school, Lucas Middle School, was dedicated in his honor. In November 2013, he was conferred with the North Carolina Award, the state's highest civil honor, for his distinguished career in public service.
