= Brandel France de Bravo =

American poet, essayist, and public health specialist

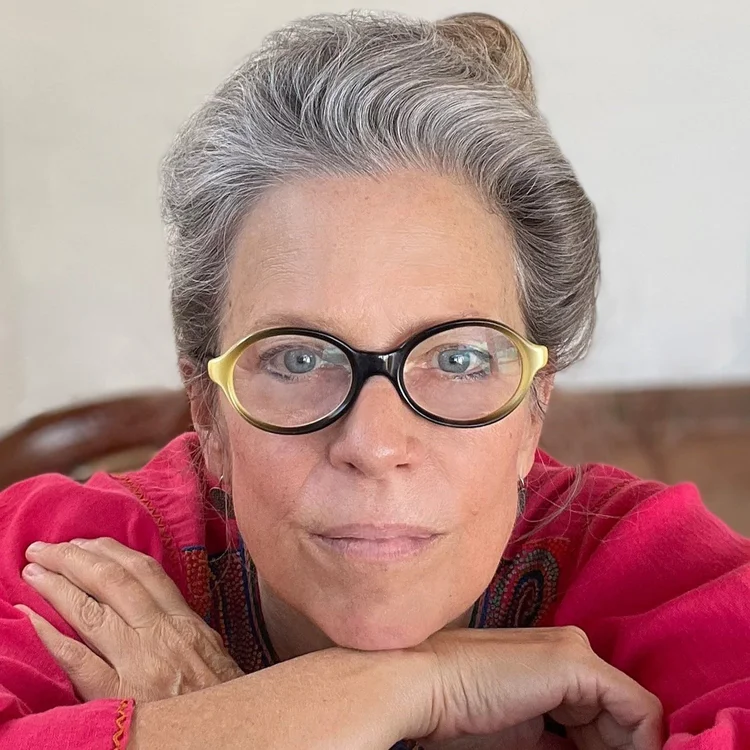
- Brandel France de Bravo (author photo)
- Education: Columbia University (MPH); Warren Wilson College (MFA); University of Pennsylvania(BA)
- Occupations: Poet, essayist, editor, compassion meditation instructor, public health advocate
- Writing career
- Notable works: Locomotive Cathedral; Mother, Loose; Provenance; Mexican Poetry Today: 20/20 Voices; Trees Make the Best Mobiles
- Website: www.brandelfrancedebravo.com

Brandel France de Bravo is an American poet, essayist, editor, translator, compassion meditation instructor, and public health advocate. She is the author of several poetry collections, editor of the bilingual anthology Mexican Poetry Today: 20/20 Voices, and co-author of the parenting book Trees Make the Best Mobiles: Simple Ways to Raise Your Child in a Complex World. Her public health career has spanned nearly three decades of work in family planning, harm reduction, HIV/AIDS, and patient decision-making in the United States and internationally.

== Education ==
France de Bravo holds a Master of Public Health (MPH) from Columbia University, a Master of Fine Arts (MFA) in creative writing from the Warren Wilson College low-residency Program for Writers, and a BA from University of Pennsylvania in Near Eastern Studies and International Relations. She was a 1983 fellow at the Center for Arabic Study Abroad in Cairo, Egypt.

In 2016 she was a fellow at Stanford University’s Distinguished Careers Institute, where her studies included strategic philanthropy, behavior change, the science of decision-making, and Compassion Cultivation Training.

== Literary career ==
=== Poetry and essays ===
France de Bravo’s poems have appeared in literary journals and anthologies, including Best American Poetry 2024, 32 Poems, Alaska Quarterly Review, The Cincinnati Review, Diode,Gulf Coast, The Kenyon Review, Poet Lore, Southern Humanities Review,The Southern Review, and elsewhere.

France de Bravo’s poetry collection, Locomotive Cathedral received honorable mention in the Backwaters Press contest and was published by the Backwaters Press, an imprint of the University of Nebraska Press in 2025. Poems in Locomotive Cathedral engage with the themes resilience, race and identity, COVID, and the Buddhist practice of tonglen. France de Bravo’s first book of poems, Provenance (2008), won the Washington Writers’ Publishing House poetry prize, and her chapbook, Mother, Loose (2015), received the Judge’s Choice Award from Accents Publishing.

France de Bravo's essays have appeared in journals such as Copper Nickel, Fourth Genre, The Georgia Review, Green Mountains Review, the Seneca Review, and elsewhere. Her essay, “A Tale of Two Rivers,” won the 2014 Penelope Niven International Literary Award in nonfiction from the Salem College Center for Women Writers.

France de Bravo has received the Larry Neal Writers' Award in Poetry as well as five artist fellowships from the DC Commission on the Arts and Humanities. She was also awarded fellowships at the Virginia Center for the Creative Arts and the Hermitage Artist Retreat.

Editing and translation

In 2010 she edited the bilingual anthology Mexican Poetry Today: 20/20 Voices, published by Shearsman Books, featuring work by twenty contemporary Mexican poets. The anthology offers a snapshot of post-war Mexican poetry and has been cited in Spanish-language reference sources and bibliographies of contemporary Mexican literature.

France de Bravo’s translations of letters by Subcomandante Marcos, leader of the 1990s Zapatista uprising, were published in TriQuarterly. She, along with other poet-translators belonging to the Tramontane Group in Mexico City, such as Jennifer Clement, published Ruido de Suenos/Noise of Dreams, a bilingual anthology of Mexican poetry from the post-war period (1940–1960).

=== Other writing ===
France de Bravo is co-author, with Jessica Teich, of Trees Make the Best Mobiles: Simple Ways to Raise Your Child in a Complex World, a parenting guide rooted in “present parenting” and influenced by the Resources for Infant Educarers (RIE) philosophy of infant-toddler care. Published by St. Martin’s Griffin in 2001, the book encourages parents to appreciate the competence of babies and toddlers, and to simplify routines and prioritize attentive, low-tech interaction with young children.

== Teaching and contemplative work ==
France de Bravo is a certified teacher of Compassion Cultivation Training, an eight-week secular meditation course developed at Stanford University. She teaches CCT online and has been a coach to CCT teachers-in-training. She has served as a contemplative coach to a Dalai Lama fellow and volunteered with Insight on the Inside which shares mindfulness practices with under-resourced or marginalized communities in Washington, D.C.

== Public health career ==
France de Bravo has worked for nearly thirty years in public health, both internationally and in the United States. Early in her career she worked with Population Services International, providing technical assistance to contraceptive social marketing programs and conducting quantitative and qualitative health research, evaluations, and needs assessments in regions including Africa, Asia, and Latin America. She served as PSI’s project director for the first nationwide HIV prevention project in Zaire (now the Democratic Republic of the Congo), funded by USAID. She has consulted for organizations such as the World Health Organization, USAID, the World Bank, Open Society Foundations, and Marie Stopes International, with a focus on family planning, harm reduction for intravenous drug users, and HIV/AIDS prevention.

In the United States, while working for the National Center for Health Research (NCHR), a non-profit organization in Washington, D.C., France de Bravo developed health education and decision-support materials to help patients and their families make informed choices about health prevention and treatment. She and NCHR president, Diana Zuckerman frequently testified before FDA Advisory Committees on issues on the safety and efficacy of medical and consumer health products. France de Bravo was NCHR’s director of communications and public affairs from 2008 to 2015. She currently serves on the Board of Directors.

== Selected works ==
=== Poetry collections ===
- France de Bravo, Brandel (2025). Locomotive Cathedral. Lincoln, NE: Backwaters Press/University of Nebraska Press. ISBN 978-1-4962-4008-8
- France de Bravo, Brandel (2015). Mother, Loose. Lexington, KY: Accents Publishing, ISBN 978-1-936628-28-5
- France de Bravo, Brandel (2008). Provenance. Washington, D.C.: Washington Writers’ Publishing House. ISBN 978-0-931846-89-2

=== Edited volumes ===
- France de Bravo, Brandel, ed. (2010). Mexican Poetry Today: 20/20 Voices. Exeter: Shearsman Books. ISBN 978-1-84861-057-6

=== Other books ===
- Teich, Jessica; France de Bravo, Brandel (2002). Trees Make the Best Mobiles: Simple Ways to Raise Your Child in a Complex World. New York: St. Martin’s Griffin. ISBN 978-0-312-30325-9
- Zuckerman, Diana; France de Bravo, Brandel (2009). The Survival Guide for Working Moms. Illinois: Quill.
