= Penelope Niven =

Penelope Ellen Niven (April 11, 1939 — August 28, 2014) was an American academic and biographer. As Penelope McJunkin, she worked at a Catholic school and multiple high schools by the late 1980s. During this time period, she worked for Earlham College and the University of Illinois, Urbana as part of the Sandburg Collection Development Project. As Penelope Niven, she was a fellow at Yale University during the mid 1990s. She also held writer-in-residence positions with Greensboro College and Salem College up to the 2000s.

Apart from education, she processed Carl Sandburg's material at Connemara during the 1970s and became an archivist there in 1979. As an author, Niven contributed to two cookbooks for people with dental braces during the 1980s. Between the 1990s to 2010s, Niven wrote biographies about Sandburg, Edward Steichen and Thornton Wilder. She also co-wrote a 1993 memoir by James Earl Jones and her own memoir in 2004. Niven was given a North Carolina Award in 2004 and posthumously joined the North Carolina Literary Hall of Fame in 2018.

== Early life and education ==
Niven's birth occurred at Waxhaw, North Carolina on April 11, 1939. Niven was interested in writing at the age of five. She also went to Charlotte, North Carolina with her parents for part of her childhood. Niven worked for multiple school publications while attending Greensboro College in the late 1950s. Niven had completed her studies at Greensboro and Wake Forest College before her 1963 marriage.

== Career ==
=== Teaching and archiving ===
After her marriage, Penelope McJunkin became an English teacher during the 1960s. She started her educational career at a Winston-Salem high school. By the late 1970s, McJunkin went to Maryland and worked for a Catholic school. From 1977 to 1978, she was at a Richmond, Indiana high school. During this time period, she started processing Carl Sandburg's written material that was at Connemara. While at Connemara, McJunkin became an archivist in 1979.

Outside of Connemara, McJunkin went to Earlham College in 1978 to work on the Sandburg Collection Development Project as a director. Two years later, the Carl Sandburg Oral History Project was created by her. She worked on both projects during the 1980s with Earlham and the University of Illinois, Urbana. By 1994, Penelope Niven was an academic for St. Mary's College of Maryland and University of North Carolina at Asheville before she joined Greensboro College as an "assistant to the president and writer-in-residence". During 1997, Niven was working at Salem College as their writer-in-residence. Niven continued to hold her position with Salem throughout the 2000s.

=== Writing and documentary ===
By 1982, Penelope McJunkin had worked as a consultant for Carl Sandburg — Echoes and Silences. That year, the documentary appeared as an episode of American Playhouse. After Niven began to use dental braces, she and her husband co-wrote the 1984 book The I Hate To Chew Cookbook: A Gourmet Guide for Adults Who Wear Orthodontic Braces. She helped her daughter create the 1988 book Teen Cuisine: A Cookbook for Young People Who Wear Orthodontic Braces. In 1991, Niven released Carl Sandburg: A Biography. As a co-writer with James Earl Jones, they published the 1993 memoir titled James Earl Jones: Voices and Silences. In 1996, Niven's daughter created Velva Jean Learns to Drive. The short film was based on a short story by Niven that was not released.

With Steichen: A Biography, her book about Edward Steichen was released the following year. She was a co-writer on the 2000 book Old Salem: The Official Guidebook. Her book with Jones had the epilogue changed in 2002 and was released as Voices and Silences. As a children's book author, Niven wrote Carl Sandburg: Adventures of a Poet in 2003 while the pictures were provided by Marc Nadel.

Her memoir, Swimming Lessons: Life Lessons from the Pool, from Diving In to Treading Water, was published the next year. For R. Philips Hayes, she edited his 2006 book titled How to Get Anyone to Do Anything. She continued her biographical career with a 2012 book on Thornton Wilder titled Thornton Wilder: A Life. Apart from writing, Niven was interviewed for The Day Carl Sandburg Died in 2011. The documentary appeared as an episode of American Masters the following year.

== Awards and honors ==
In 1984, Niven received a grant from the American Council of Learned Societies for her Sandburg work. During the 1990s, she was given fellowships for her books on Steichen and Wilder from the National Endowment for the Humanities. During this time period, she was a Yale University fellow in the mid 1990s. In 2004, Carl Sandburg: Adventures of a Poet won the Children's and Young Adults' Book Award in the Intermediate Nonfiction category from the International Literacy Association.

That year, Niven was given a North Carolina Award in the literature category. She joined the North Carolina Literary Hall of Fame posthumously in 2018. From Greensboro, Niven received the Alumni Excellence Award during 1994. Salem College created the Penelope Niven Award for Creative Writing in 1998 while the Penelope Niven Creative Nonfiction Award was created by the Salem College Center for Women Writers in 2002.

== Personal life and death ==
In 1987, Niven had a divorce. Her death occurred at Winston-Salem, North Carolina on August 28, 2014.
