= Margaret Vardell Sandresky =

American composer

- Born: April 28, 1921 (age 105); Macon, Georgia, U.S.
- Education: Salem College (BM, 1942); Eastman School of Music (MM, 1944); Hochschule für Musik Frankfurt (Fulbright, 1955)
- Occupations: Composer, organist, teacher
- Notable work: Sinfonietta, Three Marys, Windows Cantata
- Spouse: Clemens Sandresky (m. 1956)
- Children: 3
- Awards: Sam Ragan Award (2006); American Guild of Organists Distinguished Composer Award

Margaret Ferrell Vardell Sandresky (born 28 April 1921) is an American composer, organist and teacher. She was still composing on her 100th birthday. She was a founding member of the Society for Music Theory (SMT) as well as its first female contributor.

== Biography ==
Sandresky was born in Macon, Georgia, to a musical family. Her grandmother Linda Rumple Vardell founded the Conservatory of Music at Flora MacDonald College, where her grandfather Charles Graves Vardell also taught. Sandresky’s father Charles Gildersleeve Vardell was a composer and the dean of music at Salem College. Her mother had a degree in piano and voice.

Sandresky’s first organ lessons were with her father. She earned a BM from Salem College in 1942 and a MM from the Eastman School of Music in 1944, then got a Fulbright scholarship to study at the Hochschule für Musik in Frankfurt, Germany in 1955. Sandresky’s teachers included Harold Gleason, Howard Hanson, Kurt Hessenberg, Bernard Rogers, and Helmut Walcha. She married Clemens Sandresky in December 1956 and they had three children.

Sandresky taught at the Oberlin Conservatory of Music, the University of Texas at Austin, the North Carolina School of the Arts, and the Salem Academy and College. She served as the organist at Home Moravian Church, First Baptist Church, and Centenary Methodist Church in Winston-Salem.

Sandresky cofounded the North Carolina Composers Symposium and was a founding member of the SMT. She was the first woman in SMT’s history to present at its National Conference of Music Theory and the first woman to publish in its official journal, the Music Theory Spectrum. In 2006, she received the Sam Ragan Award for service to music in the state of North Carolina. She also received the American Guild of Organists Distinguished Composer Award.

Sandresky has received commissions from the American Guild of Organists, the National Endowment for the Arts, the North Carolina Arts Council, the North Carolina Music Teachers Association, and the Reynolda House Museum of American Art.

Sandresky noted that she has been heavily influenced by the Moravian Church music she heard in her childhood. The Moravian Music Foundation houses the Margaret Vardell Sandresky Collection. Her music has been published by Belwin Mills, Brodt Music Company, H. W. Gray Publishing Company, Hildegarde Press, Paraclete Press, and Wayne Leupold Editions. Her compositions include:

== Chamber ==
- Piano Trio (piano, violin and cello)
- Seven Japanese Drawings (woodwind quintet)
- Two Pieces (recorder and two violas)

== Keyboard ==
- Die Koenige aus Saba kamen da, chorale prelude (organ)
- Du Friedefurst, Herr Jesu Christ, chorale prelude (organ)
- Nocturne (piano)
- Quiet Shining (piano)
- Ricercare (piano)
- To be Played in the Mountains (piano)
- Toccata (harpsichord)

== Orchestra ==
- Brief Assemblage
- Nicole and Roland
- Sinfonietta
- Three Marys

== Vocal ==
- Come Gracious Spirit (chorus and organ)
- Jericho Cantata (chorus and piano)
- King of Glory, King of Peace (unison voices)
- “Marie Brunette”
- “My Heart's in the Highlands”
- “My Soul doth Magnify the Lord” (soprano and organ)
- Psalm 92 (chorus and organ)
- To the Chief Musician: A New Song (soprano, flute, piano and percussion)
- Two Italian Songs (chorus and handbells)
- Windows Cantata (women’s voices, organ and harp)
