= East Liberty (novel) =

2001 novel by Joseph Bathanti

- Author: Joseph Bathanti
- Language: English
- Genre: Novel
- Publisher: Banks Channel Books
- Publication date: 2001
- Publication place: United States
- Media type: Print (hardback)
- Pages: 207 pp
- ISBN: 1-889199-08-7
- OCLC: 48146645
- Dewey Decimal: 813/.6 21
- LC Class: PS3602.A89 E185 2001

East Liberty is a coming-of-age novel by the American writer Joseph Bathanti.

Set in the 1950s and 1960s in the Pittsburgh, Pennsylvania, Italian-American neighborhood of East Liberty, it tells the story of Bobby Renzo, who is raised by his unwed mother and who feels called to the Roman Catholic priesthood.

== See also ==
- Everyday People (novel)
