= Dudley Flood =

American educator and administrator

Dudley E. Flood
- Born: September 13, 1932 (age 93); Winton, North Carolina
- Education: North Carolina Central University
- Occupation: Educator
- Board member of: North Carolina Department of Public Instruction

Dudley E. Flood (born September 13, 1932) is an American retired educator and administrator in the North Carolina Department of Public Instruction and was instrumental in desegregating North Carolina schools.

== Early life ==
Dudley E. Flood, an African American, was born on September 13, 1932, in Winton, North Carolina. He received his bachelor's degree from North Carolina Central University in 1954. Flood taught from 1955 to 1967 and was a principal at a Pitt County School from 1968 to 1970. Early in his teaching career, Flood taught Eighth Grade English, Math, and Science. Prior to serving as principal, he was a high school social studies teacher as well as a varsity football and basketball coach. Flood said, "I always knew I would be a teacher. I didn't know where, how or when, but I always knew I would be a teacher." After being a principal Flood went on to work for the State Department of Public Instruction from 1970 to 1973.

== Desegregation attempts ==
While working for the Department of Public Instruction, Flood, along with Gene Causby, was tasked with helping local communities desegregate their schools. The two men traveled across the state meeting with elected officials, community activists, and parents in order to ensure desegregation. One of the toughest challenges they faced was in Hyde County, NC. In Hyde County, there had been a school boycott that had lasted almost a full year and Flood and Causby were given the task to get children back to school. They held a contentious community wide discussion where “... everyone from students, parents and teachers to the Black Panthers and Ku Klux Klan was expected to show up”. The result of the meeting; a decision to reopen the schools as one integrated school. This was just one example of the efforts undertaken by Flood during this time.

== Further education ==
Flood earned a bachelor's degree from North Carolina Central University. Later, he earned his master's degree in education administration from East Carolina University in 1970 and his Doctorate in Education from Duke University in 1980. He studied further at Elizabeth City State University, the University of North Carolina at Chapel Hill and Hampton University.

== Personal life ==
Dudley Flood was married to the late Barbara Thomas Flood for 54 years. He currently serves on several boards and committees including the N.C. Minority Cancer Awareness Action Team, Public School Forum of North Carolina Board, Wake Education Partnership Leadership Council, and the UNC Press Advancement Council; as well as many others. Additionally, Flood served on the University of North Carolina Board of Governors, as the Executive Director of North Carolina Association of School Administrators in form of Vice Chairman of North Carolina Central University.

== Awards and honors ==
Flood was inducted into the Educators Hall of Fame at East Carolina University. “The Educators Hall of Fame recognizes and highlights the service of those educators to whom East Carolina alumni and friends are most grateful. This permanent recognition is displayed prominently in the Speight Building.” In 2017, Flood was elected into the Raleigh Hall of Fame.
