= Annie Louise Wilkerson =

American obstetrician

- Born: January 18, 1914; Apex, North Carolina, U.S.
- Died: September 15, 2005 (aged 91)

Annie Louise Wilkerson (January 18, 1914 – September 15, 2005) was an American obstetrician and gynecologist. Over the course of her career, Wilkerson is estimated to have delivered 8,000 babies in Raleigh, North Carolina.

== Early life and education ==
Wilkerson, born in 1914 in Apex, North Carolina, spent many of her early years with her father, Dr. Charles Wilkerson, as he visited patients on his rounds via horse and buggy. Annie expressed interested in becoming a doctor at age two, at which point her father began teaching her basic medical knowledge. Her family moved to Raleigh in 1920.

She was one of five siblings, and her two brothers also went on to become doctors.

Despite her early training in medicine, Wilkerson's family discouraged her from going into the medical field, in part due to fears that she would never marry or have her own life if she became a doctor.

== Medical career ==
In 1936, Wilkerson graduated from the University of North Carolina at Chapel Hill with her bachelor's degree in medicine. Due to the extreme difficulty of a woman entering into medical school in North Carolina, Wilkerson traveled to Virginia for school. In her class of 72 students at Medical College of Virginia, she was one of four women. As a freshman in medical school, Wilkerson attended a delivery with her father, and delivered her first baby at age 20. The child was named Annie Louise Wilkerson Horton, after her.

Wilkerson had her internship at Rex Hospital in Raleigh, the first woman to do so. She initially faced resistance for the idea, and worked for free and lived in the hospital's maternity ward in exchange for the internship.

Wilkerson began officially practicing medicine in 1940, after becoming the first woman to complete an internship and residency at Rex Hospital in Raleigh. Wilkerson initially attended home births, but later decided to work solely at a hospital, where she felt she was better prepared to help patients. She was heavily involved with efforts fighting polio in the city in the 1940s. She attempted to enlist with the U.S. army to provide medical care to soldiers, but was denied on the premise that she was needed in Raleigh.

In 1961, Wilkerson became chief of staff at Memorial Hospital of Wake County, the first integrated hospital in the state.

Wilkerson was one of only a few Raleigh doctors who served workers at Raleigh's brothel.

She retired in 1993, alongside her two brothers.

== Publications ==
- Wilkerson, Annie Louise (1957). "Simultaneously Occurring Placenta Praevia and Placenta Accreta". North Carolina Medical Journal. 18 (3): 108–110. PMID 13407882.

== Recognition and awards ==
In 2004, Wilkerson was honored with the North Carolina Award, the state's highest civilian honor, for her contributions to science.

== Personal life ==
In 1953, Wilkerson bought a property near Falls Lake, on which she built a home and raised cows. She bought a second, adjacent parcel in the 1990s.

Wilkerson never married and had no biological children.

== Legacy ==
Wilkerson left her 150 acres of property to the city of Raleigh upon her death, on the requirement that the land not be developed and be kept as a park. The land became Raleigh's first nature preserve. Her house remained on the property, and was made into a museum and nature center.
