= Willie Snow Ethridge =

American writer and humorist (1898–1982)

- Born: Willie Annette Snow; December 10, 1898; Savannah, Georgia, US
- Died: December 14, 1982 (aged 84); Key West, Florida, US
- Resting place: Big Carpet and Cudjoe Key
- Education: Wesleyan College; Mercer University
- Occupations: Columnist; Writer; Humorist
- Writing career
- Subjects: Biography; Travel guide; History
- Notable works: You Can't Hardly Get There from Here; Strange fires: The true story of John Wesley's love affair in Georgia; Summer Thunder

Willie Snow Ethridge (December 10, 1898 – December 14, 1982), born Willie Annette Snow, was an American columnist, author, and humorist. She wrote seventeen books on biography, travel, and history, primarily biographical memoirs including an Aristocracy of Achievement (1929), As I Live and Breathe (1937), and It's Greek to Me (1948). Her other works about topics such as labor, lynching, and life include the Mingled Yarn (1938) and Strange Fires (1971). In addition, she wrote several essays and columns for The Telegraph, Good Housekeeping, and the New Republic, among other newspapers and magazines.

== Early life and education ==
Snow was born on December 10, 1898, in Savannah, Georgia, to William Aaron and Georgia Cubbedge Snow. Her family moved to Macon when she was a child, where she met her future husband, Mark Ethridge, a reporter with Macon Telegraph at the time, while still in high school.

She began working as a staffer at the Telegraph during World War I and then went on to study journalism and English at the Wesleyan College and Mercer University. In 1920, Snow married Ethridge after his return from service in the war.

== Career ==
Snow first began writing for magazines such as The Telegraph, Good Housekeeping, and the New Republic. Her first book, Aristocracy of Achievement, was published in 1929. It was a biographical account of Benjamin F. Hubert. Her first commercially successful book was a memoir titled As I Live and Breathe, published in 1937.

In late 1930s, she moved with her family to Louisville, Kentucky, where they stayed for 28 years. During this time, Snow wrote and published another ten books mainly about her life with her family, describing them as roommates. Her reputation as a humorist and satirist began to grow with the publishing of five books, the first of which was It's Greek to Me, published in 1948.

At the same time, during the 1920 and 1930s, Snow also wrote about race and gender. She joined the anti-lynching movement, mainly with the Association of Southern Women for the Prevention of Lynching. Her work was about lynching and its consequences for African Americans and laborers from all ethnicities. Her book, Mingled Yarn, published in 1938, is a pro-labor novel that describes the life of a laborer in a southern mill town.

After a trip to Russia in 1958, Snow wrote two novels, titled Nila and Russian Duet, both of which featured her travel companion, Nila Magidoff. The books found commercial success.

In 1963, she again moved with her family after Ethridge's retirement from Courier Journal, first to Garden City, New York, and then to Moncure, North Carolina, in 1965. She continued to write during this time, including Strange Fires, published in 1971, which describes the love affair of the Methodist church's cofounder, John Wesley, in colonial Georgia.

She was awarded the North Carolina Award for Literature in 1982.

== Death ==
Snow died during a visit to her son's, David W. Ethridge, house in Key West, Florida, on December 14, 1982. She was cremated and her ashes were scattered near Big Carpet and Cudjoe Key in Florida.

== Publications ==
- An Aristocracy of Achievement (1929), Presses of Review Printing Co.
- As I Live and Breathe (1937), Frederick A. Stokes
- Mingled Yarn (1938), The MacMillan Company
- I'll Sing One Song (1941), The MacMillan Company
- This Little Pig Stayed Home (1944), The Vanguard Press
- It's Greek to Me (1948), The Vanguard Press
- Going to Jerusalem (1950), The Vanguard Press
- Let's Talk Turkey (1952), The Vanguard Press
- Nila, Her Story As Told To (1956), Simon & Schuster
- Summer Thunder (1958), Coward-McCann
- Russian Duet: The Story of a Journey (1959), Simon & Schuster
- There's Yeast in the Middle East (1962), The Vanguard Press
- I Just Happen to Have Some Pictures (1964), The Vanguard Press
- You Can't Hardly Get There From Here (1965), The Vanguard Press
- Strange Fires: The True Story of John Wesley's Love Affair in Georgia (1971), The Vanguard Press
- Side by Each (1973), The Vanguard Press
