= Michael McFee =

American poet

- Born: 1954 (age 71–72); Asheville, North Carolina, U.S.
- Education: University of North Carolina, Chapel Hill (BA, MA)

Michael McFee is a poet and essayist from Asheville, North Carolina.

== Career ==
Michael McFee was born in 1954 in Asheville, North Carolina. He earned his B.A. (1976) and M.A. (1978) from University of North Carolina at Chapel Hill. He left graduate school to work a variety of jobs — editorial assistant, librarian, and freelance journalist among them — while he completed his first book. After it was published, he taught part-time at N.C. State University and the University of North Carolina at Greensboro. In the late 1980s, McFee was poet-in-residence at Cornell University and also at Lawrence University. He began teaching at the University of North Carolina at Chapel Hill in 1990, where he is now Professor of English in the Creative Writing Program. In 2018, McFee was awarded the North Carolina Award for literature, the state's highest civilian honor.

== Writings ==
Much of McFee's work deals with his native North Carolina mountains. His book of poems Earthly was co-winner of the Roanoake-Chowan Award for Poetry from the North Carolina Literary and Historical Society and was an honorable mention for the Poets' Prize; his next collection, Shinemaster, won the Thomas Wolfe Memorial Literary Award from the Western North Carolina Historical Association.

== Bibliography ==
=== Poetry ===
- Plain Air, University Presses of Florida, 1983.
- Vanishing Acts, Gnomon Press, 1989.
- To See, North Carolina Wesleyan College Press, 1991. A collaboration with photographer Elizabeth Matheson.
- Sad Girl Sitting on a Running Board, Gnomon Press, 1991.
- Colander, Carnegie Mellon University Press, 1996.
- Earthly, Carnegie Mellon University Press, 2001.
- Never Closer, Two Rivers Press, 2005. A chapbook of poems.
- Shinemaster, Carnegie Mellon University Press, 2006.
- The Smallest Talk, Bull City Press, 2007. A book of one-line poems.
- That Was Oasis, Carnegie Mellon University Press, 2012.
- We Were Once Here, Carnegie Mellon University Press, 2017.
- A Long Time to Be Gone, Carnegie Mellon University Press, 2022.

=== Essays ===
- The Napkin Manuscripts: Selected Essays and an Interview, University of Tennessee Press, 2006.
- Appointed Rounds: Essays, Mercer University Press, 2018.

=== Anthologies ===
- Editor, The Language They Speak Is Things to Eat: Poems by Fifteen Contemporary North Carolina Poets, University of North Carolina Press, 1994.
- Editor, This Is Where We Live: Short Stories by 25 Contemporary North Carolina Writers, University of North Carolina Press, 2000.
- Editor, The Spectator Reader, Spectator Publications, 1985.
