= Bob Timberlake (artist) =

American painter

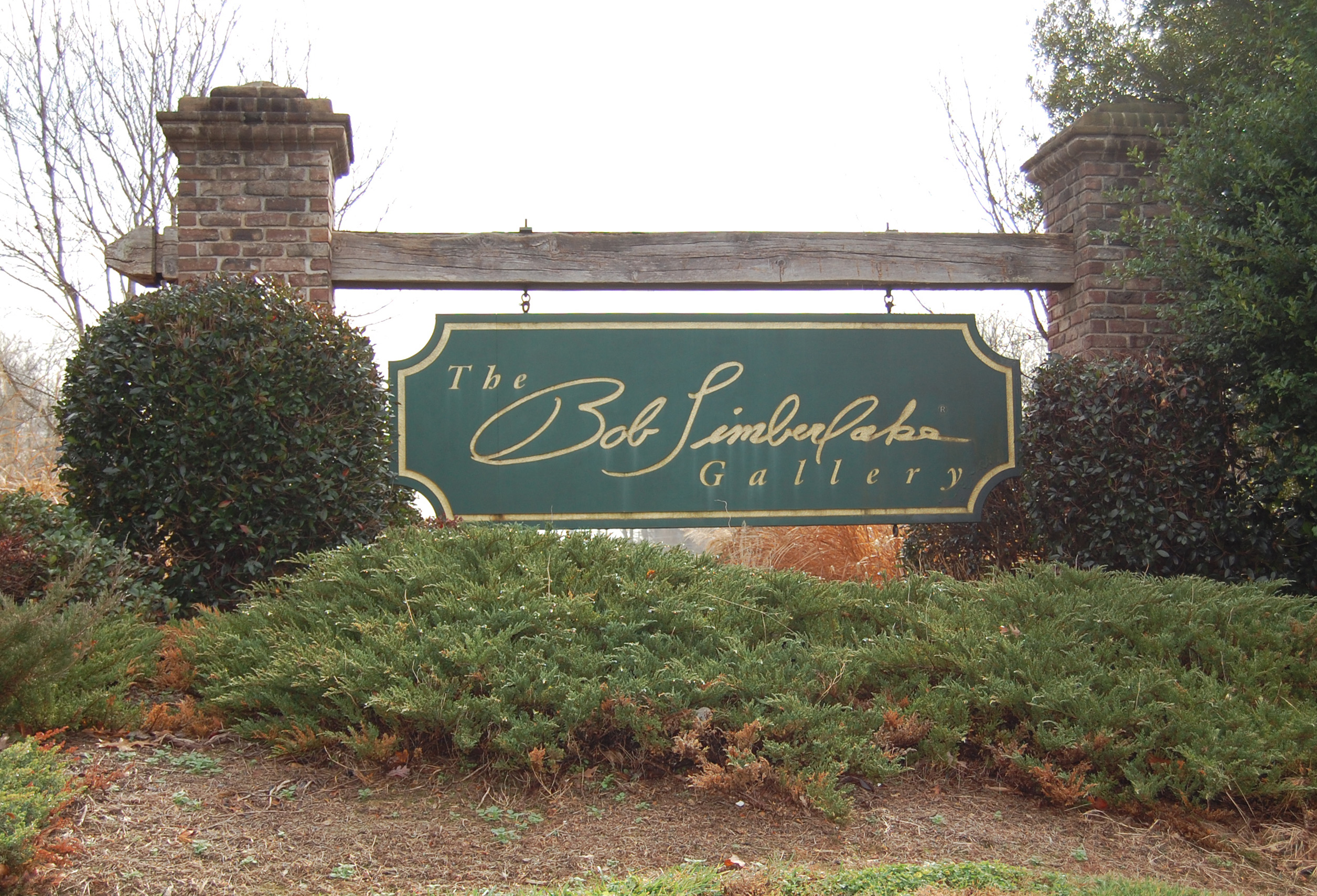
- Born: January 22, 1937 (age 89); Salisbury, North Carolina, U.S.
- Known for: Watercolor, home furnishings
- Movement: Realist painter
- Spouse: Kay Timberlake
- Website: www.bobtimberlake.com

Bob Timberlake (born January 22, 1937) is an American realist artist primarily known for his watercolor paintings as well as for designing and licensing lines of home furnishings, clothing and various other products. He began his career as an artist in 1970 and began his home furnishings line in 1990. He founded Linwood Furniture, LLC in 2006. In the fall of 2004, the Manor House Estate House at the Chetola Resort at Blowing Rock was renamed the Bob Timberlake Inn at Chetola Resort. His primary studio was created from a historic barn built in 1809 and moved to its current location in 1986.

== Background ==
Born in Salisbury, North Carolina, on January 22, 1937, and raised in Lexington, North Carolina, Timberlake always enjoyed painting, although he didn't begin his professional career until 1970, when he was 33 years old. He received a Bachelor of Science degree in Industrial Relations in 1959 from the University of North Carolina. He married in 1957 and has three children and seven grandchildren.

Bob Timberlake wrote his autobiography Partial to Home - A Memoir of the Heart, with fellow North Carolinian Jerry Bledsoe in 1999. In it he reveals that he was a self-taught artist influenced and mentored by Andrew Wyeth. Timberlake came home one night when he was 28, and upon reading an article and viewing photographs of Wyeth's work in Life magazine, was "moved to tears" and was convinced that he too was destined to become a painter. He began his career shortly thereafter.

== Furnishings ==
Bob Timberlake Gallery in Lexington, NC

Timberlake first designed and made a dresser when he was 14 and 15 which took him 350 hours to complete. Ford Motor Company selected Timberlake's work as "representative of youth in the 1950s".

Timberlake partnered with Lexington Furniture (later renamed to Lexington Home Brands) to create The World of Bob Timberlake, which became the best-selling furniture collection in industry history. The Bob Timberlake brand includes a range of furniture styles, including Eighteenth century, Arts and Crafts, and English and Irish cottage.

== Postage stamps ==
Timberlake has designed four different postage stamps for the United States Postal Service, including a 15 cent stamp titled Wreath and Toys issued on Oct. 31, 1980, which was based on antique toys in artist Bob Timberlake’s collection. (Scott catalogue number 1843), as well as the 1988 North Carolina Statehood stamp, and 1989 South Carolina Statehood stamp.

== Galleries ==
There is a Timberlake gallery at 1714 East Center Street Extension in Lexington, North Carolina. The gallery offers original and signed lithographed artwork by Timberlake, as well as home furnishings and other items created or designed by him and licensed by various manufacturers.

== Exhibitions ==
His first art exhibition was a sold-out show in May 1970 in Winston-Salem, North Carolina.

In 1973, he held the first of seven one-person exhibits at Hammer Galleries in New York City. The first show was sold out before it opened, the first time this had ever happened for this well established gallery.

Along with Norman Rockwell, he exhibited at the Artists of America show in 1974, at the Franklin Center in Philadelphia and in New Jersey.

In 1998, Timberlake painted "White House Christmas" for the exhibition "White House Impressions: The President's House Through the Eye of the Artist." He was one of only 14 artists chosen to depict the White House for the exhibition sponsored by the White House Historical Association. It has been exhibited in the White House and in several presidential libraries.

In 2007, in celebration of his 70th birthday, the Bob Timberlake Gallery featured an exhibit of 70 pieces spanning his career.

== Awards and honors ==
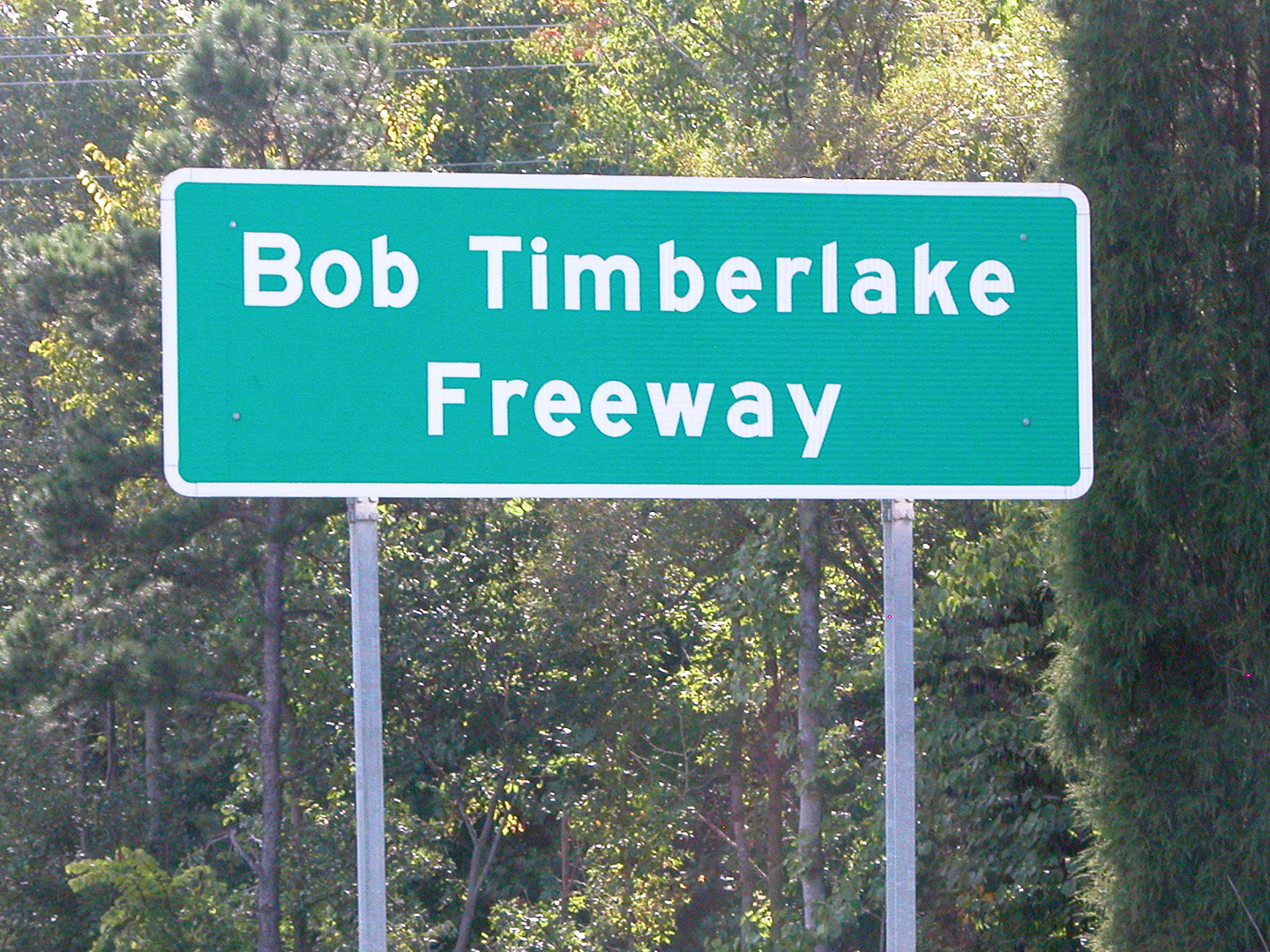
A section of Interstate 85 near exit 96 in North Carolina has been designated as the Bob Timberlake Freeway

- 1978 - He was recognized by then President Jimmy Carter for his work with Keep America Beautiful. Three years earlier, he had been named The Official Artist of Keep America Beautiful, lnc. and the official spokesperson for Keep America Beautiful.
- 1978 – He received the North Carolina Public Service Award.
- 1979 – He received an Honorary Degree for Doctor of Humanities Honoris Causa from High Point University.
- 1981 – Was officially recognized by then current President Ronald Reagan, along with Iron Eyes Cody and the Keep America Beautiful organization during an Oval Office ceremony.
- 1987 – Honored by the North Carolina Cystic Fibrosis Foundation and the Duke University Comprehensive Cancer Center for his humanitarian service, which have so far raised over $7.3 million (as of 2009) by the sale of his donated artwork.
- 1989 – Received the Albert Schweitzer Prize for Humanitarianism for Artistry.
- 1989 – Duke University Comprehensive Cancer Center awarded him the Shingleton Award for his support.
- 1995 – Was given a distinguished alumni award from the University of North Carolina at Chapel Hill.
- 1998 – Was honored as the North Carolina Press Association’s North Carolinian of the Year in Pinehurst, NC.
- 2002 – Received an Honorary Doctor of Humanities from Methodist College, Fayetteville, NC
- 2006 – Awarded the Order of the Long Leaf Pine, North Carolina’s highest civilian honor.
