= Philip Gerard =

American writer and educator (1955–2022)

- Born: April 7, 1955; Newark, Delaware, U.S.
- Died: November 7, 2022 (aged 67); Wilmington, North Carolina, U.S.
- Education: University of Delaware (B.A.); University of Arizona (M.F.A.)
- Occupations: Writer, professor, historian
- Spouse: Jill Gerard
- Writing career
- Genres: Fiction, creative nonfiction, historical writing
- Notable works: Cape Fear Rising*; The Art of Creative Research*
- Notable awards: North Carolina Award for Literature (2019)

Philip Gerard (April 7, 1955 – November 7, 2022) was an American writer, professor, and historian. For more than thirty years, he was a professor in the creative writing department at the University of North Carolina Wilmington. He was the author of over a dozen books, including both fiction and creative nonfiction. His most provocative writing was concerning the American Civil War and the subsequent Wilmington massacre, America's only coup d'état. In 2019 he received the North Carolina Award for Literature.

== Early life and education ==
Born in Newark, Delaware, Gerard grew up there and attended St. Andrew's School in Middletown. He earned a Bachelor of Arts degree in English and Anthropology from the University of Delaware. He completed his Masters of Fine Arts at the University of Arizona in 1981.

== Career ==
Gerard worked as a writer and educator for over three decades. He taught creative writing at University of North Carolina Wilmington and was an early advocate for the creative writing department and its MFA program. With his wife, Jill Gerard, he served as co-editor of the literary journal Chautauqua.

Gerard documented history, and was praised for inciting interest about historic topics. His historical research was crucial to his nonfiction work, as seen in his book The Last Battleground: The Civil War Comes to North Carolina and his involvement in the North Carolina Civil War and Reconstruction History Center.

Gerard's 1994 novel, Cape Fear Rising, brought the Wilmington massacre to public attention. The massacre is also known as the Wilmington coup of 1898 and its history was suppressed for nearly 100 years. Gerard tells the story of this violent overthrow of an elected city government after Reconstruction and during the Jim Crow era. This was America's only coup d'état. The book is credited with sparking a community-wide conversation about the event. Gerard's book was cited in 2006 by the North Carolina government in the 1898 Wilmington race riot report (pages 426-428). The report resulted in the 2007 passage of Senate Joint Resolution 1572 in which the State of North Carolina "expresses [its] profound regret...that the government was unsuccessful in protecting its citizens during that time." Further public attention was brought to Gerard's book with the publication in 2021 of the Pulitzer Prize winning book Wilmington's Lie: The Murderous Coup of 1898 and the Rise of White Supremacy, by David Zucchino, and a PBS American Experience documentary, American Coup: Wilmington 1898 released in late 2024.

Gerard was also a regular contributor to Our State Magazine and provided commentary for WHQR public radio. His work for the magazine included popular and exhaustively researched series on the American Civil War and North Carolina's history throughout different decades.

== Works ==
Gerard's published work spans fiction and creative nonfiction.

- Hatteras Light (Scribners 1986): A novel nominated for the Ernest Hemingway Prize.
- Brilliant Passage: A Schooning Memoir (Mystic 1989): Chronicles a voyage on the classic schooner-yacht Brilliant.
- Cape Fear Rising (Blair 1994): A historical novel examining the 1898 Wilmington coup.
- Creative Nonfiction: Researching and Crafting Stories of Real Life (Story Press 1996): An instructional text that became a selection of the Book-of-the-Month and Quality Paperback Book Clubs.
- Desert Kill (William Morrow 1994): A novel.
- The Last Battleground: The Civil War Comes to North Carolina (UNC Press 2012): A nonfiction book based on his Our State Magazine series.
- The Patron Saint of Dreams (Louisiana State University Press 2012): A collection of essays.
- Down the Wild Cape Fear: A River Journey Through the Heart of North Carolina (UNC Press 2018): A nonfiction work chronicling a 200-mile river journey.
- The Art of Creative Research (UNC Press 2017): An instructional book for writers.

== Awards and recognition ==
- Ernest Hemingway Prize Nomination (1986): For his novel Hatteras Light.
- Chancellor's Medal for Excellence in Teaching (1993): Awarded by University of North Carolina Wilmington.
- Sam Ragan Fine Arts Award (2012): Awarded by St. Andrews University (North Carolina).
- North Carolina Award for Literature (2019): The highest civilian honor bestowed by the state.

== Death and legacy ==
Gerard died unexpectedly on November 7, 2022, at the age of 67. His influence as an author and a professor is widely recognized in North Carolina's literary community. His legacy is commemorated at UNC Wilmington through a graduate fellowship in creative writing established in his name.
