= Helen Bevington =

American poet (1906–2001)

Helen E. Bevington
- Born: Helen Elizabeth Smith; 1906; Afton, New York, U.S.
- Died: March 16, 2001 (aged 94–95); Chicago, U.S.
- Education: University of Chicago; Columbia University
- Occupations: Poet; essayist; diarist; educator
- Writing career
- Notable work: Charley Smith's Girl (1965)
- Notable awards: Roanoke-Chowan Award for Poetry (1956); North Carolina Award for Literature (1973); Mayflower Cup (1974)

Helen E. Bevington (née Smith; 1906 – March 16, 2001) was an American poet, prose writer, and educator. Her most noted book, Charley Smith's Girl (1965), was "banned by the library in the small town of Worcester, N.Y., where she grew up, because the book tells of her minister father's having been divorced by her mother for affairs that he was carrying on with younger female parishioners."

== Life and works ==
Born Helen E. Smith in Afton, New York, Bevington was reared in Worcester, New York, where her father was a Methodist minister. She attended the University of Chicago and earned a degree in philosophy. She proceeded to write a thesis about Thoreau, earning a master's degree in English from Columbia University. On June 1, 1928, she married Merle M. Bevington, son of reverend M. W. Bevington. The couple travelled abroad, returning in 1929 in response to the Stock Market Crash of 1929. Both Bevingtons taught English at Duke University starting in the 1940s, Helen retiring in 1976. They had two sons: the elder, David Bevington, was a pre-eminent Shakespeare scholar until his death in 2019; the second son, Philip, died in the 1980s.

In addition to her 12 books of poetry and essays, Bevington's work appeared in The New York Times Book Review, The Atlantic Monthly, The New Yorker and The American Scholar. Bevington was a poet, a diarist, and an essayist. She was also a winner of the Roanoke-Chowan Award for Poetry (1956) and the Mayflower Cup (1974) both given by the North Carolina Literary and Historical Association; and the North Carolina Award for Literature (1973). Charley Smith's Girl (1965) was runner-up for the Pulitzer Prize.

Helen Bevington died on March 16, 2001, in Chicago.

== Bibliography ==
- Dr. Johnson’s Waterfall, and Other Poems. Boston, Mass.: Houghton Mifflin, 1946
- Nineteen Million Elephants, and Other Poems. Boston, Mass.: Houghton Mifflin, 1950
- A Change of Sky, and Other Poems. Boston, Mass.: Houghton Mifflin, 1956
- When Found, Make a Verse of. New York: Simon and Schuster, 1961
- Charley Smith’s Girl: A Memoir. New York: Simon and Schuster, 1965
- A Book & A Love Affair. New York: Harcourt, Brace & World, 1968
- The House Was Quiet and the World Was Calm. New York: Harcourt Brace Jovanovich, 1971
- Beautiful Lofty People. New York: Harcourt Brace Jovanovich, 1974
- Along Came the Witch: A Journal in the 1960s. New York: Harcourt Brace Jovanovich, 1976.
- The Journey Is Everything: A Journal of the Seventies. Durham, N.C.: Duke University Press, 1983
- The World and the Bo Tree. Durham, N.C.: Duke University Press, 1991
- The Third and Only Way: Reflections on Staying Alive. Durham, N.C.: Duke University Press, 1996
