= Betty Adcock =

American poet (born 1938)

Elizabeth Sharp Adcock (born September 16, 1938) is an American poet and a 2002–2003 Guggenheim Fellow. Author of six poetry collections, she has served as a faculty member in the Warren Wilson College MFA Program for Writers in Asheville, North Carolina and in the Writer-in-Residence program at Meredith College in Raleigh, North Carolina. She has also held residencies at Lenoir-Rhyne College, Kalamazoo College, and Duke University, and has twice served as Visiting Distinguished Professor at North Carolina State University. Adcock's work has been cited as a major influence on substantial artists such as 2006 Pulitzer Poetry winner Claudia Emerson.

== Life ==
The daughter of a landowner and a schoolteacher, Adcock grew up in San Augustine, Texas, a small farming community. The landscape of the area, a mix of West and Deep South, influenced her work. She moved to North Carolina after her marriage to Donald Adcock, who died in 2011. The two have a daughter, Sylvia.

Adcock is primarily self-taught. She has no degrees, though she attended Texas Tech University, Goddard College, and North Carolina State University. She studied and wrote poetry for more than ten years while working in the business world. After her first book was published, she was awarded a teaching residency at Duke University. Other teaching positions followed, most notably her ongoing position as Writer in Residence at Meredith College, which she held until 2006.

== Poetry collections ==
Adcock's poetry collections include the following:

- Walking out: Poems, 1975
- Nettles: Poems, 1983
- Beholdings: Poems, 1988
- The Difficult Wheel: Poems, 1995
- Intervale: New and Selected Poems, 2001 (winner of the Poets' Prize and a finalist for the Lenore Marshall Poetry Prize)
- Slantwise: Poems, 2008 (Louisiana State University Press L.E. Phillabaum Prize volume for 2008)
- Widow Poems, 2014
- Rough Fugue, 2017

== Awards ==
Adcock's awards include the following:

- State of North Carolina Artist Fellowship in Poetry, 1988
- North Carolina Award for Literature, 1996
- Texas Institute of Letters Prize, 1996
- Sam Ragan Award in Fine Arts, 1998
- Guggenheim Fellowship, 2002
- Poets' Prize, 2003
- Two Pushcart Prizes
- National Endowment for the Arts Fellowship in Poetry

== See also ==
- Paul Jones (computer technologist)
