= Robert Lindgren (dancer) =

Ballet dancer and professor (1923–2013)

Robert Lindgren (1923–2013) was a Canadian-born dancer and dance educator.

== Biography ==
Lindgren was born on December 9, 1923, in Victoria, British Columbia. He studied ballet in Canada and New York and danced with Ballet Theatre in New York in the early 1940s before serving in the Royal Canadian Air Force during World War II. After his discharge in 1944, he joined the Ballet Russe de Monte Carlo, dancing with the company from 1945 to 1952.

In 1952, Lindgren married fellow dancer and teacher Sonja Tyven. From 1957 to 1959, he was a soloist with the New York City Ballet. He also performed on television, Broadway, and State Department tours, primarily in contemporary ballets and as the Golden Slave in Schéhérazade.

After retiring from the New York City Ballet, Lindgren and Tyven opened the Lindgren-Tyven School of Ballet in Phoenix, Arizona. They later moved to Winston-Salem, North Carolina, where Lindgren became the first dean of dance at the newly established North Carolina School of the Arts, serving from 1965 to 1987.

During his tenure, Lindgren founded and directed the professional ballet company North Carolina Dance Theater and co-choreographed the school's annual production of The Nutcracker with Tyven. In 1987, he resigned as dean and succeeded Lincoln Kirstein as director and president of the School of American Ballet in New York. He left the position in 1991.
