= James Ephraim McGirt =

American poet (1874–1930)

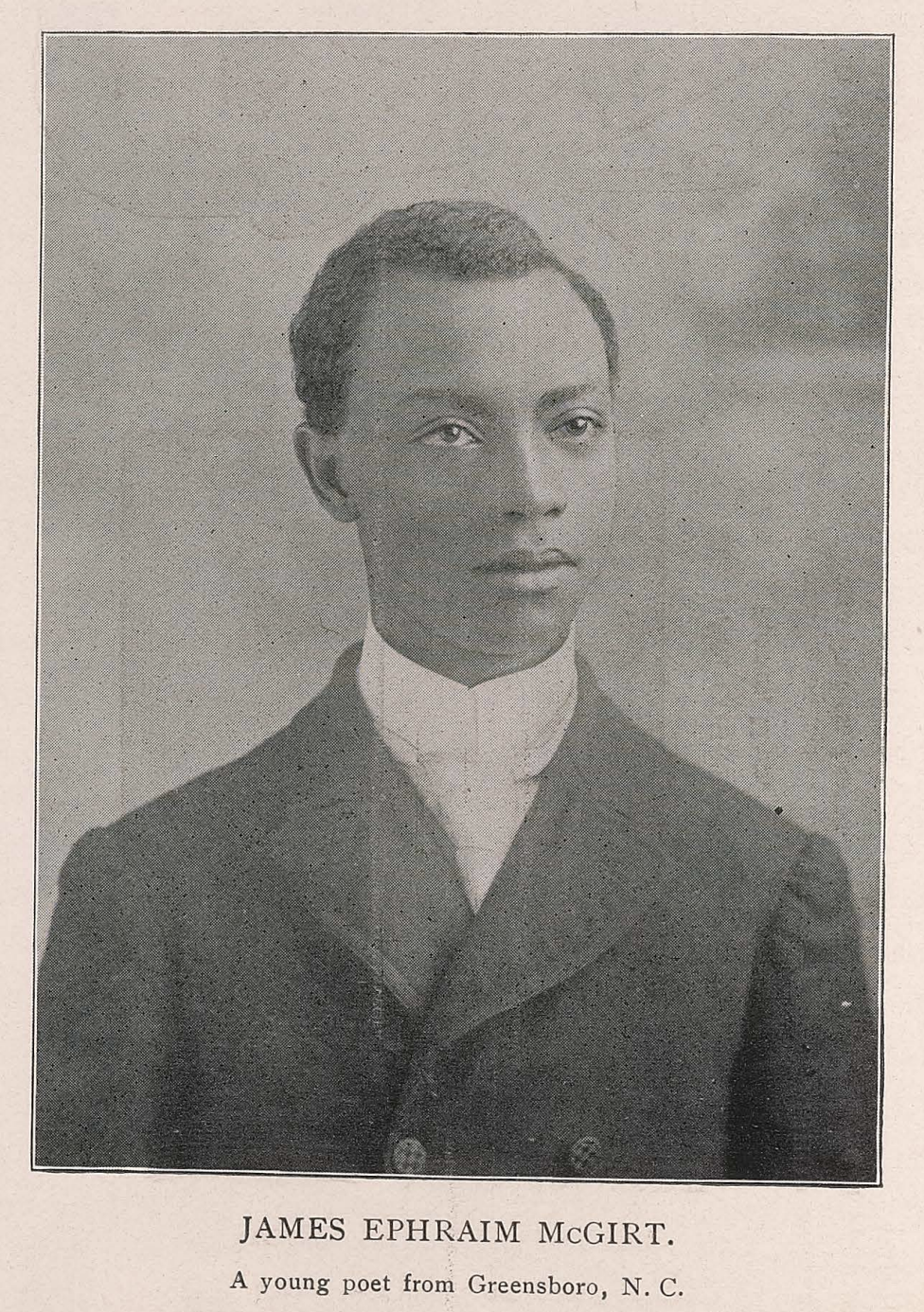
James Ephraim McGirt, 1900

James Ephraim McGirt (1874–1930) was an African American poet, publisher, editor, and businessman. He was from North Carolina and published his poetry, as well as his own magazine.

== Life and career ==
James Ephraim McGirt was born in 1874, on a rural farm in Robeson County, North Carolina. He attended public schools in Greensboro, North Carolina. McGirt graduated in 1895 from Bennett College, a historically black college in Greensboro, North Carolina.

He started McGirt's Magazine, which he published for six years before moving on to a career as a businessman and real estate developer.
