= Joseph Bathanti =

American poet, novelist and professor

- Born: July 20, 1953 (age 73); Pittsburgh, Pennsylvania, U.S.
- Education: University of Pittsburgh (BA)
- Occupations: Poet; novelist; professor
- Spouse: Joan
- Children: 2
- Writing career
- Notable awards: North Carolina Poet Laureate

Joseph Bathanti (born July 20, 1953, Pittsburgh, Pennsylvania) is an American poet, novelist and professor. He was appointed by Bev Perdue, the governor of North Carolina as the seventh North Carolina Poet Laureate from 2012 to 2014.

== Biography ==
=== Early life and education ===
Bathanti was born July 20, 1953, in Pittsburgh, Pennsylvania, and grew up in the East Liberty area of Pittsburgh. His grandparents were immigrants from Italy and France. His working-class family included a steelworker father and a seamstress mother.

After graduating from Central Catholic High School in Pittsburgh, he attended California State College. In 1972, he transferred to the University of Pittsburgh and, in 1975, received a bachelor's degree in English.

=== Personal life ===
Bathanti lives in Vilas, North Carolina, with his wife, Joan, and two children. Bathanti and his wife met while both were working with the VISTA program.

== Career ==
After graduating from the University of Pittsburgh, Bathanti traveled to North Carolina in 1976 as part of the Volunteers In Service To America (VISTA) program focusing on prison outreach. He has continued to teach writing and hold workshops in prisons ever since.

From 1985 to 1989, he worked closely with the North Carolina Visiting Artist Program which sought to bring talented artists from different disciplines to more rural towns and areas in the state. His book They Changed the State: The Legacy of North Carolina’s Visiting Artists, 1971–95 chronicled the history of the program.

Bathanti is currently a professor of creative writing at Appalachian State University. Also at Appalachian State, he is Director of Writing in the Field as well as Writer-in-Residence for the Watauga Global Community. He also serves as a mentor in the Master of Fine Arts program at Carlow University in Pittsburgh.

He was installed as the seventh North Carolina Poet Laureate on September 20, 2012, at a ceremony in Raleigh, North Carolina. Over the next two years he became an "ambassador of N.C. literature" and was free to create his own long-term projects. The position requires the laureate to participate in various literary activities across the state, working with "schools, community groups, and the press."

Since his appointment, he has been a part of over 250 events around North Carolina. In 2014, Bathanti was named the first scholar-in-residence for the Heinz History Center's Italian American Program in Pittsburgh. Focusing on Italian American history, he will create a body of work developed from the center's Italian American Collection.

In 2024, Bathanti was inducted into the North Carolina Literary Hall of Fame.

== Awards ==
Bathanti has received many awards and honors including:

- The Sam Ragan Fine Arts Award (1995)
- Oscar Arnold Young Award – The North Carolina Poetry Council (1997)
- Carolina Novel Award – Banks Channel Books (2001)
- Sherwood Anderson Award (2002)
- Linda Flowers Literary Award – NC Humanities Council (2002)
- Novello Literary Award (2006)
- The Spokane Prize – Eastern Washington University
- North Carolina Poet Laureate (2012–2014)
- Ragan-Rubin Award – North Carolina English Teachers Association (2012)

== Bibliography ==
=== Poetry ===
- Communion Partners (Briarpatch Press, 1986)
- Anson County (Williams & Simpson, 1989; reprinted: Parkway Publishers, 2005)
- The Feast of All Saints (Nightshade press, 1994)
- This Metal (St. Andrews College Press, 1996; reprinted: Press 53, 2012)
- Land of Amnesia (Press 53, 2009)
- Restoring Sacred Art (Star Cloud Press, 2010)
- "Concertina" (Mercer University Press, 2013)

=== Fiction ===
- East Liberty (Banks Channel Books, 2001)
- Coventry (Novello Festival Press, 2006)
- The High Heart (Eastern Washington University Press, 2007); short stories
- The Life of the World to Come: A Novel (University of South Carolina Press, 2014)
- The Act of Contrition & Other Stories (EastOver Press, 2023)

=== Non-fiction ===
- They Changed the State: The Legacy of North Carolina’s Visiting Artists, 1971–95 (The North Carolina Arts Council, 2007)
