= Sam Ragan =

American journalist

- Born: Samuel Talmadge Ragan; December 31, 1915; Granville County, North Carolina
- Died: May 11, 1996 (aged 80); Southern Pines, North Carolina, U.S.
- Education: Atlantic Christian College
- Occupations: Journalist, poet
- Spouse: Marjorie Usher (1917-2001)

Samuel Talmadge Ragan (December 31, 1915 – May 11, 1996) was an American journalist, author, poet, and arts advocate from North Carolina.

== Early life and education ==
Sam Ragan was born in Berea, North Carolina, an unincorporated community in Granville County. In 1936, he graduated from Atlantic Christian College, (now Barton College) in Wilson, North Carolina.

== Career ==
He served briefly as a reporter for the San Antonio Evening News (now the San Antonio Express-News) and then returned to North Carolina, where, beginning in 1941, he held various editorial positions with The Raleigh News & Observer.

While with the News & Observer, he began writing Southern Accent, a weekly newspaper column of literary criticism, commentary and poetry. It became the longest running column in the United States and appeared in forty-three states and twenty-four foreign countries. In 1969 he purchased The Pilot, a small weekly newspaper in Southern Pines, North Carolina. Ragan served as its editor and publisher, remaining active on The Pilot's staff until his death.

In addition to his work as a newspaperman Ragan published six collections of verse including Journey into Morning and To The Water's Edge, as well as several works of non-fiction.

He was the first secretary of the North Carolina Department of Cultural Resources and the first chair of the North Carolina Arts Council. He taught creative writing and journalism at Sandhills Community College, St. Andrews Presbyterian College (now St. Andrews University) and North Carolina State University. He served as president of the Associated Press Managing Editors and the North Carolina Press Association. In addition to serving on the boards of several associations devoted to history, music and the humanities he helped found and guide the North Carolina School of the Arts, and the Weymouth Center for the Arts and Humanities.

Ragan was a recipient of the North Carolina Award in Fine Arts, the John Taylor Caldwell Award for The Humanities, The Roanoke-Chowan Award for Poetry, the R. Hunt Parker Award for Literary Achievement, the Morrison Award and the North Caroliniana Society Award. He was elected to both the North Carolina Journalism Hall of Fame and the North Carolina Literary Hall of Fame. Ragan was awarded honorary doctorates at St. Andrews University in Laurinburg, North Carolina, Atlantic Christian College, The University of North Carolina at Chapel Hill, and Methodist College, in Fayetteville, North Carolina. In 1982, Governor Jim Hunt named Sam Ragan North Carolina's Poet Laureate for life.

== Personal life ==
A member of the Presbyterian church, Ragan was also a lifelong member of the Democratic Party. Ragan married Marjorie Usher in 1939. They were married for 56 years and had two daughters, Talmadge and Nan. Ragan died in Southern Pines, North Carolina at the age of 80.

== Legacy ==
In 1981, St. Andrews University established the Sam Ragan Awards, are given annually to honor contributions to fine art. Barton College founded the Sam and Marjorie Ragan Writing Center in their honor. In 2003 the North Carolina Literary and Historical Association paid tribute to Ragan's memory by establishing the Ragan Old North State Award Cup for Nonfiction.

Elena Ruehr composed a musical piece titled "Exodus", based on four poems by Ragan. The work was commissioned by the Coastal Carolina Chamber Music Festival and premiered during the 2005 season.

== Books ==
- Back to Beginnings: Adlai E. Stevenson and North Carolina. [Co-authored with Elizabeth S. Ives]. Charlotte, N.C.: Heritage Printers, 1969.
- Collected Poems of Sam Ragan. Laurinburg, N.C.: St. Andrews Press, 1990.
- Journey into Morning. Laurinburg, N.C.: St. Andrews Press, 1981.
- Listening to the Wind. Laurinburg, N.C.: St. Andrews Press, 1995.
- The New Day. [Editor]. Zebulon, N.C.: Record Publishing Company, 1964.
- Poetry under the Stars. [Editor; Friday Noon Poets]. Durham, N.C.: Moore Publishing Company, 1979.
- To the Water's Edge. Durham, N.C.: Moore Publishing Company, 1971.
- The Tree in the Far Pasture. Winston-Salem, N.C.: John F. Blair, Publisher, 1964.
- A Walk into April. Laurinburg, N.C.: St. Andrews Press, 1986.
- Weymouth: An Anthology of Poetry [Editor]. Laurinburg, N.C.: St. Andrews Press, 1987.
