= Press 53 =

Publishing company in North Carolina, United States

- Founded: 2005
- Founder: Kevin Morgan Watson
- Country of origin: United States
- Headquarters location: Winston-Salem, North Carolina
- Distribution: Ingram
- Fiction genres: Short story, poetry
- Official website: www.press53.com

Press 53 is an independent publisher located in Winston-Salem, North Carolina. Known for championing the work of short story writers and poets, who face challenges in the publishing industry, Press 53 was launched in the wake of 9-11 when founder Kevin Morgan Watson lost his job at US Airways.

== Notable titles and writers ==
In 2005, Press 53's first titles were authored by Doug Frelke, a veteran of the United States Navy and the Gulf War. By 2006, the press had reprinted The Land Breakers, an out-of-print classic novel by North Carolina writer John Ehle.

In addition, the press has issued books by poets laureate Joseph Bathanti (NC), Cathy Smith Bowers (NC), Kathryn Stripling Byer (NC), Shelby Stephenson (NC), Marjory Heath Wentworth (SC), Kelly Cherry (VA), and David Bottoms (GA). What the Zhang Boys Know, a novel in stories by Clifford Garstang published by the press in 2012, won the Library of Virginia Literary Award for Fiction and in 2015 earned Garstang the Indiana Emerging Author Award. The story collection "One Last Good Time" by Michael Kardos won the 2012 Mississippi Institute of Arts & Letters Award for Fiction. The story collection O Monstrous World! by Josh Woods (writer) won the 2019 International Book Awards for Fiction: Short Story.

== Annual titles ==
As a small press, Press 53 publishes around fifteen books annually.
