= List of United States representatives in the 67th Congress =

This is a complete list of United States representatives during the 67th United States Congress listed by seniority. For the most part, representatives are ranked by the beginning of their terms in office.

As an historical article, the districts and party affiliations listed reflect those during the 67th Congress (March 4, 1921 – March 3, 1923). Seats and party affiliations on similar lists for other congresses will be different for certain members.

This article describes the criteria for seniority in the House of Representatives and sets out the list of members by seniority. It is prepared on the basis of the interpretation of seniority applied to the House of Representatives in the current congress. In the absence of information to the contrary, it is presumed that the twenty-first-century practice is identical to the seniority customs used during the 67th Congress.

== Seniority ==
=== House seniority ===
Seniority in the House, for representatives with unbroken service, depends on the date on which the members first term began. That date is either the start of the Congress (4 March in odd numbered years, for the era up to and including the 73rd Congress starting in 1933) or the date of a special election during the Congress. Since many members start serving on the same day as others, ranking between them is based on alphabetical order by the last name of the representative. If there is still a tie, then the first names are used.

Representatives who return to the House, after having previously served, are credited with service equal to one less than the total number of terms they served. When a representative has served a prior term of less than two terms (i.e., prior term minus one equals less than one), the member is ranked above all others whose service begins on the same day.

=== Committee seniority ===
At the start of the 67th Congress in 1921, the committee assignments were made by each party and then formally approved by the whole House. Each party controlled the committee ranking of its members, but usually this followed the order of seniority of members in terms of service on the committee. It was customary for members of a committee, in the previous congress, to be re-appointed at the start of the next.

A seniority rule was normally used to decide committee chairmen. The chairman was likely to be the majority member of a committee, with the longest continuous service on it. However, party leadership was typically not associated with seniority.

Out of a group of fifty nine standing committee chairmen, at the start of this Congress, Nelson Polsby identified forty four as the most senior member of the majority on the committee. In fifteen other cases, senior majority members were compensated for not being chairman of the committee (ten chaired another committee and five received better committee assignments than in the previous Congress). In no instance was there no obvious compensation for the apparent violation of the seniority custom.

== Committees ==
This list refers to the standing committees of the House in the 67th Congress, the year of establishment as a standing committee (adoption of the name used in 1921), the number of members assigned to the committee and the corresponding committee in the current congress. Because of consolidation of committees and changes of jurisdiction, it is not always possible to identify a clear successor panel.

No.	1921 committee	Established	Members	2011 committee
1	Accounts	1805	11	House Administration
2	Agriculture	1820	21	Agriculture
3	Alcoholic Liquor Traffic	1893	11	Judiciary
4	Appropriations	1865	35	Appropriations
5	Banking and Currency	1865	21	Financial Services
6	Census	1901	16	Oversight and Government Reform
7	Claims	1794	16	Judiciary
8	Coinage, Weights and Measures	1864 (1867)	18	Financial Services
9	Disposition of Executive Papers	1911	2	House Administration
10	District of Columbia	1808	21	Oversight and Government Reform
11	Education	1867 (1883)	15	Education and the Workforce
12	Election of President, Vice President and Representatives	1893	13	House Administration
13	Elections No. 1	1789 (1895)	9	House Administration
14	Elections No. 2	1895	9	House Administration
15	Elections No. 3	1895	9	House Administration
16	Enrolled Bills	1876	7	House Administration
17	Expenditures in the Agriculture Department	1889	7	Oversight and Government Reform
18	Expenditures in the Commerce Department	1903 (1913)	7	Oversight and Government Reform
19	Expenditures in the Interior Department	1860	7	Oversight and Government Reform
20	Expenditures in the Justice Department	1874	7	Oversight and Government Reform
21	Expenditures in the Labor Department	1913	7	Oversight and Government Reform
22	Expenditures in the Navy Department	1816	7	Oversight and Government Reform
23	Expenditures in the Post Office Department	1816	7	Oversight and Government Reform
24	Expenditures in the State Department	1816	7	Oversight and Government Reform
25	Expenditures in the Treasury Department	1816	7	Oversight and Government Reform
26	Expenditures in the War Department	1816	7	Oversight and Government Reform
27	Expenditures on Public Buildings	1816	7	Oversight and Government Reform
28	Foreign Affairs	1822	21	Foreign Affairs
29	Immigration and Naturalization	1893	15	Judiciary
30	Indian Affairs	1821	19	Natural Resources
31	Industrial Arts and Expositions	1903	16	Foreign Affairs
32	Insular Affairs	1899	21	Natural Resources
33	Interstate and Foreign Commerce	1795 (1892)	21	Energy and Commerce
34	Invalid Pensions	1831	16	Veterans' Affairs
35	Irrigation of Arid Lands	1893	13	Natural Resources
36	Judiciary	1813	21	Judiciary
37	Labor	1883	13	Education and the Workforce
38	Merchant Marine and Fisheries	1887	21	...
39	Mileage	1837	5	House Administration
40	Military Affairs	1822	21	Armed Services
41	Mines and Mining	1865	14	Natural Resources
42	Naval Affairs	1822	21	Armed Services
43	Patents	1837	14	Judiciary
44	Pensions	1880	15	Veterans' Affairs
45	Post Office and Post Roads	1808	21	Oversight and Government Reform
46	Public Buildings and Grounds	1837	20	Transportation and Infrastructure
47	Public Lands	1805	21	Natural Resources
48	Railways and Canals	1831 (1869)	14	Transportation and Infrastructure
49	Reform in the Civil Service	1893	13	Oversight and Government Reform
50	Revision of Laws	1868	13	Judiciary
51	Rivers and Harbors	1883	21	Transportation and Infrastructure
52	Roads	1913	21	Transportation and Infrastructure
53	Rules	1880	12	Rules
54	Territories	1825	17	Natural Resources
55	War Claims	1825 (1873)	15	Judiciary
56	Ways and Means	1802	25	Ways and Means
57	Woman Suffrage	1917	13	...
Joint Committees (House standing committee members only)
Jt 1	Library Joint	1806	5	House Administration
Jt 2	Printing Joint	1846	3	House Administration

== List of representatives by seniority ==
A numerical rank is assigned to each of the 435 members initially elected to the 67th Congress. Other members, who joined the House during the Congress, are not assigned a number.

Three representatives-elect died before the Congress started. The list below includes those Representatives-elect (with names in italics), with the seniority they would have held if they had been able to be sworn in.

The notes indicate female members and those from particular backgrounds: [AA] African American (none in this Congress), [AP] Asian Pacific, [F] Female and [H] Hispanic.

Major party designations used in this article are D for Democratic members and R for Republican representatives. Other designations include Ind for Independent and Soc for Socialist.

U.S. House seniority
Rank	Representative	Party	District	Seniority date	Notes
Twenty-three non-consecutive terms
1	Joseph G. Cannon	R	IL-18	March 4, 1915	Previously served 1873–91 and 1893–1913 while in the House. Last term while serving in the House.
Fifteen consecutive terms
2	Frederick H. Gillett	R	MA-2	March 4, 1893	Dean of the House. Speaker of the House.
Fourteen non-consecutive terms
3	Henry A. Cooper	R	WI-1	March 4, 1921	Previously served 1893–1919 while in the House.
Thirteen consecutive terms
4	Thomas S. Butler	R	PA-7	March 4, 1897	Independent Republican, 1897–99. Chairman: Naval Affairs
5	James R. Mann	R	IL-2	March 4, 1897	Died on November 30, 1922, while still serving in the House.
6	William S. Greene	R	MA-15	May 31, 1898	Chairman: Merchant Marine and Fisheries
Thirteen non-consecutive terms
7	Frank W. Mondell	R	WY-al	March 4, 1899	Previously served 1895–97 while in the House. Majority Leader. Last term while serving in the House.
Twelve consecutive terms
8	Joseph W. Fordney	R	MI-8	March 4, 1899	Chairman: Ways and Means. Last term while serving in the House.
9	Gilbert N. Haugen	R	IA-4	March 4, 1899	Chairman: Agriculture
10	William W. Rucker	D	MO-2	March 4, 1899	Last term while serving in the House.
Twelve non-consecutive terms
11	Richard W. Parker	D	NJ-9	March 4, 1921	Previously served 1895–1911 and December 1, 1914–19 while in the House. Last term while serving in the House.
Eleven consecutive terms
12	Henry D. Flood	D	VA-10	March 4, 1901	Died on December 8, 1921, while still serving in the House.
13	Claude Kitchin	D	NC-2	March 4, 1901	Minority Leader
14	Lemuel P. Padgett	D	TN-7	March 4, 1901	Died on August 2, 1922, while still serving in the House.
15	Edward W. Pou	D	NC-4	March 4, 1901	
Eleven non-consecutive terms
16	Julius Kahn	R	CA-4	March 4, 1905	Previously served 1899–1903 while in the House. Chairman: Military Affairs.
Ten consecutive terms
17	Philip P. Campbell	R	KS-3	March 4, 1903	Chairman: Rules. Last term while serving in the House.
18	Charles R. Davis	R	MN-3	March 4, 1903	Chairman: Appropriations (1921)
19	John N. Garner	D	TX-15	March 4, 1903	
20	Benjamin G. Humphreys	D	MS-3	March 4, 1903	
21	Moses P. Kinkaid	R	NE-6	March 4, 1903	Chairman: Irrigation of Arid Lands. Died on July 6, 1922, while still serving in the House.
22	Halvor Steenerson	R	MN-9	March 4, 1903	Chairman: Post Office and Post Roads. Last term while serving in the House.
23	Andrew J. Volstead	R	MN-7	March 4, 1903	Chairman: Judiciary. Last term while serving in the House.
Ten non-consecutive terms
24	William A. Rodenberg	R	IL-22	March 4, 1915	Previously served 1899–1901 and 1903–13 while in the House. Chairman: Flood Control. Last term while serving in the House.
25	Daniel J. Riordan	D	NY-11	November 6, 1906	Previously served 1899–1901 while in the House.
Nine consecutive terms
26	Thomas M. Bell	D	GA-9	March 4, 1905	
27	Frank Clark	D	FL-2	March 4, 1905	
28	Finis J. Garrett	D	TN-9	March 4, 1905	
29	Gordon Lee	D	GA-7	March 4, 1905	
30	Martin B. Madden	R	IL-1	March 4, 1905	
Nine non-consecutive terms
31	Theodore E. Burton	R	OH-22	March 4, 1921	Previously served 1889–91 and 1895–1909 while in the House (elected to, but did not serve in the 61st Congress)
32	Charles E. Fuller	R	IL-12	March 4, 1915	Previously served 1903–13 while in the House. Chairman: Invalid Pensions.
33	Nicholas Longworth	R	OH-1	March 4, 1915	Previously served 1903–13 while in the House.
Eight consecutive terms
34	Rufus Hardy	D	TX-6	March 4, 1907	Last term while serving in the House.
35	Willis C. Hawley	R	OR-1	March 4, 1907	
36	Ben Johnson	D	KY-4	March 4, 1907	
37	John W. Langley	R	KY-10	March 4, 1907	Chairman: Public Buildings and Grounds
38	James C. McLaughlin	R	MI-9	March 4, 1907	
39	Adolph J. Sabath	D	IL-5	March 4, 1907	
40	Daniel R. Anthony, Jr.	R	KS-1	May 23, 1907	
41	Charles D. Carter	D	OK-3	November 16, 1907	
42	C. Bascom Slemp	R	VA-9	December 17, 1907	Last term while serving in the House.
Eight non-consecutive terms
43	Burton L. French	R	ID-1	March 4, 1917	Previously served 1903–09 and 1911–15 while in the House.
44	William H. Stafford	R	WI-5	March 4, 1921	Previously served 1903–11 and 1913–19. Last term while serving in the House until 71st Congress.
45	John M. Nelson	R	WI-3	March 4, 1921	Previously served September 4, 1906–19 while in the House.
46	Harry C. Woodyard	R	WV-4	November 7, 1916	Previously served 1903–11 while in the House. Last term while serving in the House until 69th Congress.
Seven consecutive terms
47	Joseph W. Byrns	D	TN-6	March 4, 1909	
48	J. Campbell Cantrill	D	KY-7	March 4, 1909	
49	James W. Collier	D	MS-8	March 4, 1909	
50	James W. Good	R	IA-5	March 4, 1909	Chairman: Appropriations. Resigned on June 15, 1921, while still serving in the House.
51	William W. Griest	R	PA-9	March 4, 1909	
52	William A. Oldfield	D	AR-2	March 4, 1909	Minority Whip
53	Thomas U. Sisson	D	MS-4	March 4, 1909	Last term while serving in the House.
54	Edward T. Taylor	D	CO-4	March 4, 1909	
55	Robert Y. Thomas, Jr.	D	KY-3	March 4, 1909	
56	H. Garland Dupré	D	LA-2	November 8, 1910	
Seven non-consecutive terms
57	Benjamin K. Focht	R	PA-17	March 4, 1915	Previously served 1907–13. Chairman: District of Columbia. Last term while serving in the House until 73rd Congress.
58	W. Bourke Cockran	R	NY-16	March 4, 1921	Previously served 1887–89; November 3, 1891–95 and February 23, 1904–09 while in the House. Died on March 1, 1923, while still serving in the House.
Six consecutive terms
59	Sydney Anderson	R	MN-1	March 4, 1911	
60	Fred L. Blackmon	D	AL-4	March 4, 1911	Died, as Representative-elect: February 8, 1921
61	James F. Byrnes	D	SC-2	March 4, 1911	
62	Ira C. Copley	R	IL-11	March 4, 1911	Progressive 1915–17. Last term while serving in the House.
63	Robert L. Doughton	D	NC-8	March 4, 1911	
64	William J. Fields	D	KY-9	March 4, 1911	
65	Henderson M. Jacoway	D	AR-5	March 4, 1911	Last term while serving in the House.
66	J. Charles Linthicum	D	MD-4	March 4, 1911	
67	John C. McKenzie	R	IL-13	March 4, 1911	
68	Luther W. Mott	R	NY-32	March 4, 1911	
69	Stephen G. Porter	R	PA-29	March 4, 1911	Chairman: Foreign Affairs
70	John E. Raker	D	CA-2	March 4, 1911	
71	Arthur B. Rouse	D	KY-6	March 4, 1911	
72	Charles M. Stedman	D	NC-5	March 4, 1911	
73	Horace M. Towner	R	IA-8	March 4, 1911	Republican Conference Chairman. Chairman: Insular Affairs.
74	William R. Green	R	IA-9	June 5, 1911	
75	Leonidas C. Dyer	R	MO-12	March 4, 1915	Previously served 1911-June 19, 1914, while in the House.
76	Carl T. Hayden	D	AZ-al	February 19, 1912	
77	William S. Vare	R	PA-1	May 24, 1912	Resigned on January 2, 1923, while in the House. Last term until 68th Congress while serving in the House.
78	Frank L. Greene	R	VT-1	July 30, 1912	Last term while serving in the House.
79	Samuel M. Taylor	D	AR-6	January 15, 1913	Died on September 13, 1921, while still serving in the House.
Six non-consecutive terms
80	John Q. Tilson	R	CT-3	March 4, 1915	Previously served 1909–13 while in the House.
81	Charles R. Crisp	D	GA-3	March 4, 1913	Previously served December 19, 1896–97 while in the House.
Five consecutive terms
82	James B. Aswell	D	LA-8	March 4, 1913	
83	Alben W. Barkley	D	KY-1	March 4, 1913	
84	Frederick A. Britten	R	IL-9	March 4, 1913	
85	Edward E. Browne	R	WI-8	March 4, 1913	
86	John F. Carew	D	NY-18	March 4, 1913	
87	Louis C. Cramton	R	MI-7	March 4, 1913	
88	Charles F. Curry	R	CA-3	March 4, 1913	Chairman: Territories
89	Thomas B. Dunn	R	NY-38	March 4, 1913	Chairman: Roads. Last term while serving in the House.
90	George W. Edmonds	R	PA-4	March 4, 1913	Chairman: Claims
91	Simeon D. Fess	R	OH-7	March 4, 1913	Chairman: Education. Last term while serving in the House.
92	James A. Frear	R	WI-10	March 4, 1913	
93	George S. Graham	R	PA-2	March 4, 1913	
94	Albert Johnson	R	WA-3	March 4, 1913	Chairman: Immigration and Naturalization
95	Patrick H. Kelley	R	MI-6	March 4, 1913	Last term while serving in the House.
96	Ambrose Kennedy	R	RI-3	March 4, 1913	Last term while serving in the House.
97	Edgar R. Kiess	R	PA-15	March 4, 1913	
98	Aaron S. Kreider	R	PA-18	March 4, 1913	Chairman: Expenditures in the Interior Department. Last term while serving in the House.
99	Ladislas Lazaro	D	LA-7	March 4, 1913	
100	Carl E. Mapes	R	MI-5	March 4, 1913	
101	Andrew J. Montague	D	VA-3	March 4, 1913	
102	John M. Morin	R	PA-31	March 4, 1913	
103	John I. Nolan	R	CA-5	March 4, 1913	Chairman: Labor. Died November 18, 1922, while still serving in the House.
104	James S. Parker	R	NY-29	March 4, 1913	
105	Percy E. Quin	D	MS-7	March 4, 1913	
106	Sam Rayburn	D	TX-4	March 4, 1913	Democratic Caucus Chairman
107	John J. Rogers	R	MA-5	March 4, 1913	
108	Nicholas J. Sinnott	R	OR-2	March 4, 1913	Chairman: Public Lands
109	Addison T. Smith	R	ID-2	March 4, 1913	Chairman: Alcohol Liquor Traffic. Chairman: Irrigation of Arid Lands (1922).
110	Hatton W. Sumners	D	TX-5	March 4, 1913	
111	Allen T. Treadway	R	MA-1	March 4, 1913	
112	Otis T. Wingo	D	AR-4	March 4, 1913	
113	Samuel E. Winslow	R	MA-4	March 4, 1913	Chairman: Interstate and Foreign Commerce
114	George M. Young	R	ND-2	March 4, 1913	
115	James P. Buchanan	D	TX-10	April 15, 1913	
116	John A. Peters	R	ME-3	September 9, 1913	Resigned, to become a US District Judge: January 2, 1922
117	Calvin D. Paige	R	MA-3	November 4, 1913	
118	Frank Park	D	GA-2	November 4, 1913	
119	James A. Gallivan	D	MA-12	April 7, 1914	
120	Henry W. Temple	R	PA-24	November 2, 1915	Previously served (Progressive) 1913–15 while in the House.
121	Carl Vinson	D	GA-10	November 3, 1914	
Five non-consecutive terms
122	William E. Mason	R	IL-al	March 4, 1917	Previously served 1887–91 while in the House. Died on June 16, 1921, while still serving in the House.
Four consecutive terms
123	Edward B. Almon	D	AL-8	March 4, 1915	
124	Isaac Bacharach	R	NJ-2	March 4, 1915	
125	Eugene Black	D	TX-1	March 4, 1915	
126	John G. Cooper	R	OH-19	March 4, 1915	
127	Porter H. Dale	R	VT-2	March 4, 1915	Chairman: Expenditures in the Treasury Department
128	Frederick W. Dallinger	R	MA-8	March 4, 1915	Chairman: Elections No. 1
129	George P. Darrow	R	PA-6	March 4, 1915	
130	S. Wallace Dempsey	R	NY-40	March 4, 1915	Chairman: Rivers and Harbors
131	Edward E. Denison	R	IL-25	March 4, 1915	
132	Cassius C. Dowell	R	IA-7	March 4, 1915	Chairman: Elections No. 3
133	John A. Elston	R	CA-6	March 4, 1915	Progressive 1915–17; Republican and Progressive candidate: 1916 election. Died on December 15, 1921, while still serving in the House.
134	Richard P. Freeman	R	CT-2	March 4, 1915	
135	Mahlon M. Garland	R	PA-al	March 4, 1915	Died, as Representative-elect: November 19, 1920
136	James P. Glynn	R	CT-5	March 4, 1915	Chairman: Expenditures in the Post Office Department. Last term while serving in the House until 79th Congress.
137	Lindley H. Hadley	R	WA-2	March 4, 1915	
138	Frederick C. Hicks	R	NY-1	March 4, 1915	Last term while serving in the House.
139	George Huddleston	D	AL-9	March 4, 1915	
140	Harry E. Hull	R	IA-2	March 4, 1915	
141	James W. Husted	R	NY-25	March 4, 1915	Last term while serving in the House.
142	Elijah C. Hutchinson	R	NJ-4	March 4, 1915	Last term while serving in the House.
143	W. Frank James	R	MI-12	March 4, 1915	
144	Royal C. Johnson	R	SD-2	March 4, 1915	Chairman: Expenditures in the War Department
145	Charles C. Kearns	R	OH-6	March 4, 1915	
146	David H. Kincheloe	D	KY-2	March 4, 1915	
147	Edward J. King	R	IL-15	March 4, 1915	Chairman: Expenditures in the Agriculture Department
148	Frederick R. Lehlbach	R	NJ-10	March 4, 1915	Chairman: Reform in the Civil Service
149	Walter W. Magee	R	NY-35	March 4, 1915	
150	Whitmell P. Martin	D	LA-3	March 4, 1915	Progressive 1915–19
151	Clifton N. McArthur	R	OR-3	March 4, 1915	Last term while serving in the House.
152	James V. McClintic	D	OK-7	March 4, 1915	
153	Louis T. McFadden	R	PA-14	March 4, 1915	Chairman: Banking and Currency
154	Merrill Moores	R	IN-7	March 4, 1915	
155	Sydney E. Mudd II	R	MD-5	March 4, 1915	
156	William B. Oliver	D	AL-6	March 4, 1915	
157	C. William Ramseyer	R	IA-6	March 4, 1915	
158	C. Frank Reavis	R	NE-1	March 4, 1915	Resigned on June 3, 1922, while still serving in the House.
159	Thomas D. Schall	R	MN-10	March 4, 1915	Chairman: Alcohol Liquor Traffic (1922)
160	Frank D. Scott	R	MI-11	March 4, 1915	
161	William J. Sears	D	FL-4	March 4, 1915	
162	Isaac Siegel	R	NY-20	March 4, 1915	Chairman: Census. Last term while serving in the House.
163	Homer P. Snyder	R	NY-33	March 4, 1915	Chairman: Indian Affairs
164	Henry B. Steagall	D	AL-3	March 4, 1915	
165	Walter R. Stiness	R	RI-2	March 4, 1915	Last term while serving in the House.
166	Burton E. Sweet	R	IA-3	March 4, 1915	Last term while serving in the House.
167	John N. Tillman	D	AR-3	March 4, 1915	
168	Charles B. Timberlake	R	CO-2	March 4, 1915	
169	George H. Tinkham	R	MA-11	March 4, 1915	
170	Joseph Walsh	R	MA-16	March 4, 1915	Resigned on August 2, 1922, while still serving in the House.
171	Charles B. Ward	R	NY-27	March 4, 1915	
172	Edward H. Wason	R	NH-2	March 4, 1915	
173	Henry W. Watson	R	PA-8	March 4, 1915	
174	Loren E. Wheeler	R	IL-21	March 4, 1915	Chairman: Railways and Canals. Last term until 69th Congress.
175	Thomas S. Williams	R	IL-24	March 4, 1915	
176	Riley J. Wilson	D	LA-5	March 4, 1915	
177	James W. Wise	D	GA-6	March 4, 1915	
178	William R. Wood	R	IN-10	March 4, 1915	
179	Peter F. Tague	D	MA-10	October 23, 1919	Previously served 1915–19 while in the House.
180	Norman J. Gould	R	NY-36	November 2, 1915	Last term while serving in the House.
181	Bertrand H. Snell	R	NY-31	November 2, 1915	Chairman: War Claims
182	George M. Bowers	R	WV-2	May 9, 1916	Last term while serving in the House.
183	Thomas W. Harrison	D	VA-7	November 7, 1916	Unseated on election contest: December 15, 1922. Last term until seated in 68th Congress.
Four non-consecutive terms
184	Walter M. Chandler	R	NY-19	March 4, 1921	Previously served 1913–19 (Progressive 1913–17) while in the House. Last term while serving in the House.
185	M. Clyde Kelly	R	PA-30	March 4, 1917	Previously served (Republican) 1913–15 while in the House. Progressive 1917–19.
186	James W. Overstreet	D	GA-1	March 4, 1917	Previously served October 3, 1906–07 while in the House. Last term while serving in the House.
Three consecutive terms
187	William B. Bankhead	D	AL-10	March 4, 1917	
188	Oscar E. Bland	R	IN-2	March 4, 1917	Chairman: Industrial Arts and Expositions. Last term while serving in the House.
189	Thomas L. Blanton	D	TX-17	March 4, 1917	
190	Charles H. Brand	D	GA-8	March 4, 1917	First elected January 11, 1917 (before the start of the 65th Congress)
191	Guy E. Campbell	D	PA-32	March 4, 1917	
192	David G. Classon	R	WI-9	March 4, 1917	Last term while serving in the House.
193	Tom T. Connally	D	TX-11	March 4, 1917	
194	Frederick H. Dominick	D	SC-3	March 4, 1917	
195	Herbert J. Drane	D	FL-1	March 4, 1917	
196	Louis W. Fairfield	R	IN-12	March 4, 1917	
197	Hubert F. Fisher	D	TN-10	March 4, 1917	
198	William J. Graham	R	IL-14	March 4, 1917	
199	Ira G. Hersey	R	ME-4	March 4, 1917	
200	Clifford C. Ireland	R	IL-16	March 4, 1917	Chairman: Accounts. Last term while serving in the House.
201	J. Marvin Jones	D	TX-18	March 4, 1917	
202	Harold Knutson	R	MN-6	March 4, 1917	Majority Whip. Chairman: Pensions
203	Milton Kraus	R	IN-11	March 4, 1917	Last term while serving in the House.
204	William W. Larsen	D	GA-12	March 4, 1917	
205	Clarence F. Lea	D	CA-1	March 4, 1917	
206	Edward C. Little	R	KS-2	March 4, 1917	Chairman: Revision of Laws
207	Joseph J. Mansfield	D	TX-9	March 4, 1917	
208	John F. Miller	R	WA-1	March 4, 1917	
209	Henry Z. Osborne	R	CA-10	March 4, 1917	Died on February 8, 1923, while still serving in the House.
210	Fred S. Purnell	R	IN-9	March 4, 1917	
211	Stuart F. Reed	R	WV-3	March 4, 1917	Chairman: Expenditures in the Justice Department
212	John M. Rose	R	PA-19	March 4, 1917	Last term while serving in the House.
213	Archie D. Sanders	R	NY-39	March 4, 1917	
214	Everett Sanders	R	IN-5	March 4, 1917	
215	William F. Stevenson	D	SC-5	March 4, 1917	First elected February 21, 1917 (before the start of the 65th Congress)
216	Nathan L. Strong	R	PA-27	March 4, 1917	
217	Christopher D. Sullivan	D	NY-13	March 4, 1917	
218	Albert H. Vestal	R	IN-8	March 4, 1917	Chairman: Coinage, Weights and Measures
219	Edward Voigt	R	WI-2	March 4, 1917	
220	Wallace H. White, Jr.	R	ME-2	March 4, 1917	Chairman: Woman Suffrage
221	Frederick N. Zihlman	R	MD-6	March 4, 1917	Chairman: Expenditures in the Post Office Department; Chairman: District of Columbia; Chairman: Labor (1922)
222	Zebulon Weaver	D	NC-10	March 4, 1919	Previously served 1917-March 1, 1919, while in the House.
223	Sherman E. Burroughs	R	NH-1	May 29, 1917	Died January 27, 1923, while still serving in the House.
224	Richard N. Elliott	R	IN-6	June 29, 1917	Chairman: Expenditures in the State Department
225	Willfred W. Lufkin	R	MA-6	November 6, 1917	Resigned June 30, 1921, while still serving in the House.
226	Schuyler Merritt	R	CT-4	November 6, 1917	
227	William C. Wright	D	GA-4	January 16, 1918	
228	Anthony J. Griffin	D	NY-22	March 5, 1918	
229	John W. Rainey	D	IL-4	April 2, 1918	
230	S. Otis Bland	D	VA-1	July 2, 1918	
231	Florian Lampert	R	WI-6	November 5, 1918	Chairman: Patents
232	Adolphus P. Nelson	R	WI-11	November 5, 1918	Last term while serving in the House.
233	James P. Woods	D	VA-6	February 25, 1919	Last term while serving in the House.
Three non-consecutive terms
234	William E. Andrews	R	NE-5	March 4, 1919	Previously served 1895–97. Chairman: Election of President, Vice President and Representatives. Last term while serving in the House.
235	Edgar C. Ellis	R	MO-5	March 4, 1921	Previously served 1905–09. Last term while still serving in the House until 69th Congress.
236	Benjamin L. Fairchild	R	NY-24	March 4, 1921	Previously served 1895–97 and 1917–19 while in the House. Last term until seated in the 68th Congress
237	Daniel E. Garrett	D	TX-8	March 4, 1921	Previously served 1913–15 and 1917–19 while in the House.
238	Meyer London	Soc	NY-12	March 4, 1921	Socialist. Previously served 1915–19 while in the House. Last term while serving in the House.
239	Marion E. Rhodes	R	MO-13	March 4, 1919	Previously served 1905–07. Chairman: Mines and Mining. Last term while serving in the House.
240	Edwin D. Ricketts	R	OH-11	March 4, 1919	Previously served 1915–17 while in the House. Last term while serving in the House.
241	Milton W. Shreve	Ind R	PA-25	March 4, 1919	Independent Republican. Previously served (Republican) 1913–15 while in the House. Republican 1919–21.
242	Anderson H. Walters	R	PA-al	March 4, 1919	Previously served 1913–15 while in the House. Chairman: Expenditures in the Labor Department. Last term while serving in the House until 69th Congress.
Two consecutive terms
243	Ernest R. Ackerman	R	NJ-5	March 4, 1919	
244	Henry E. Barbour	R	CA-7	March 4, 1919	
245	James T. Begg	R	OH-13	March 4, 1919	
246	John S. Benham	R	IN-4	March 4, 1919	Chairman: Expenditures on Public Buildings. Last term while serving in the House.
247	William D. Boies	R	IA-11	March 4, 1919	
248	John C. Box	D	TX-2	March 4, 1919	
249	Clay S. Briggs	D	TX-7	March 4, 1919	
250	Samuel M. Brinson	D	NC-3	March 4, 1919	Died on April 13, 1922, while still serving in the House.
251	Edward S. Brooks	R	PA-20	March 4, 1919	Last term while serving in the House.
252	Edwin B. Brooks	R	IL-23	March 4, 1919	Last term while serving in the House.
253	Clark Burdick	R	RI-1	March 4, 1919	
254	William J. Burke	R	PA-al	March 4, 1919	Last term while serving in the House.
255	Carl R. Chindblom	R	IL-10	March 4, 1919	
256	Charles A. Christopherson	R	SD-1	March 4, 1919	
257	R. Clint Cole	R	OH-8	March 4, 1919	
258	Frank Crowther	R	NY-30	March 4, 1919	
259	Thomas H. Cullen	D	NY-4	March 4, 1919	
260	Ewin L. Davis	D	TN-5	March 4, 1919	
261	Lester J. Dickinson	R	IA-10	March 4, 1919	
262	James W. Dunbar	R	IN-3	March 4, 1919	Last term while serving in the House until 71st Congress
263	Leonard S. Echols	R	WV-6	March 4, 1919	Chairman: Expenditures in the Navy Department. Last term while serving in the House.
264	Robert E. Evans	R	NE-3	March 4, 1919	Last term while serving in the House.
265	Israel M. Foster	R	OH-10	March 4, 1919	
266	Wells Goodykoontz	R	WV-5	March 4, 1919	Last term while serving in the House.
267	Guy U. Hardy	R	CO-3	March 4, 1919	
268	Edward D. Hays	R	MO-14	March 4, 1919	Last term while serving in the House.
269	Andrew J. Hickey	R	IN-13	March 4, 1919	
270	Homer Hoch	R	KS-4	March 4, 1919	
271	Alanson B. Houghton	R	NY-37	March 4, 1919	Resigned on February 28, 1922, while still serving in the House.
272	Claude B. Hudspeth	D	TX-16	March 4, 1919	
273	Albert W. Jefferis	R	NE-2	March 4, 1919	Last term while serving in the House.
274	Paul B. Johnson, Sr.	D	MS-6	March 4, 1919	Last term while serving in the House.
275	Evan J. Jones	R	PA-21	March 4, 1919	Last term while serving in the House.
276	Samuel A. Kendall	R	PA-23	March 4, 1919	
277	John C. Kleczka	R	WI-4	March 4, 1919	Last term while serving in the House.
278	William C. Lankford	D	GA-11	March 4, 1919	
279	Caleb R. Layton	R	DE-al	March 4, 1919	Last term while serving in the House.
280	Robert Luce	R	MA-13	March 4, 1919	Chairman: Elections No. 2
281	Oscar R. Luhring	R	IN-1	March 4, 1919	Last term while serving in the House.
282	Clarence MacGregor	R	NY-41	March 4, 1919	
283	John McDuffie	D	AL-1	March 4, 1919	
284	Melvin O. McLaughlin	R	NE-4	March 4, 1919	
285	Isaac V. McPherson	R	MO-15	March 4, 1919	Last term while serving in the House.
286	James M. Mead	D	NY-42	March 4, 1919	
287	Earl C. Michener	R	MI-2	March 4, 1919	
288	C. Ellis Moore	R	OH-15	March 4, 1919	
289	B. Frank Murphy	R	OH-18	March 4, 1919	Chairman: Expenditures in the Commerce Department
290	Cleveland A. Newton	R	MO-10	March 4, 1919	
291	Walter H. Newton	R	MN-5	March 4, 1919	
292	Charles F. Ogden	R	KY-5	March 4, 1919	Last term while serving in the House.
293	Lucian W. Parrish	D	TX-13	March 4, 1919	Died on March 27, 1922, while still serving in the House.
294	Amos H. Radcliffe	R	NJ-7	March 4, 1919	Last term while serving in the House.
295	John Reber	R	PA-12	March 4, 1919	Chairman: Mileage. Last term while still serving in the House.
296	Daniel A. Reed	R	NY-43	March 4, 1919	
297	Carl W. Riddick	R	MT-2	March 4, 1919	Last term while serving in the House.
298	John M. Robsion	R	KY-11	March 4, 1919	
299	James H. Sinclair	R	ND-3	March 4, 1919	
300	John H. Smithwick	D	FL-3	March 4, 1919	
301	Ambrose E.B. Stephens	R	OH-2	March 4, 1919	
302	James G. Strong	R	KS-5	March 4, 1919	
303	John W. Summers	R	WA-4	March 4, 1919	
304	J. Will Taylor	R	TN-2	March 4, 1919	
305	Charles J. Thompson	R	OH-5	March 4, 1919	
306	Jasper N. Tincher	R	KS-7	March 4, 1919	
307	William D. Upshaw	D	GA-5	March 4, 1919	
308	William N. Vaile	R	CO-1	March 4, 1919	
309	J. Stanley Webster	R	WA-5	March 4, 1919	
310	Hays B. White	R	KS-6	March 4, 1919	
311	Richard Yates	R	IL-al	March 4, 1919	
312	Fritz G. Lanham	D	TX-12	April 19, 1919	
313	R. Walton Moore	D	VA-8	April 27, 1919	
314	James O'Connor	D	LA-1	June 5, 1919	
315	Oscar E. Keller	R	MN-4	July 1, 1919	Independent Republican 1919–21
316	Lilius B. Rainey	D	AL-7	September 30, 1919	Last term while serving in the House.
317	Philip H. Stoll	D	SC-6	October 7, 1919	Last term while serving in the House.
318	Patrick H. Drewry	D	VA-4	April 27, 1920	
319	Rorer A. James	D	VA-5	June 1, 1920	Died on August 6, 1921, while still serving in the House.
320	Hamilton Fish III	R	NY-26	November 2, 1920	
321	Francis F. Patterson, Jr.	R	NJ-1	November 2, 1920	
322	Nathan D. Perlman	R	NY-14	November 2, 1920	
323	Harry C. Ransley	R	PA-3	November 2, 1920	
324	Lester D. Volk	R	NY-10	November 2, 1920	Last term while serving in the House.
325	William B. Bowling	D	AL-5	December 14, 1920	
Two non-consecutive terms
326	Albert A. Blakeney	R	MD-2	March 4, 1921	Previously served 1901–03. Last term while serving in the House.
327	Thomas A. Chandler	R	OK-1	March 4, 1921	Previously served 1917–19 while in the House. Last term while serving in the House.
328	George K. Favrot	D	LA-6	March 4, 1921	Previously served 1907–09 while in the House.
329	John J. Kindred	D	NY-2	March 4, 1921	Previously served 1911–13 while in the House.
330	Joseph McLaughlin	R	PA-al	March 4, 1921	Previously served 1917–19 while in the House. Last term while serving in the House.
331	Peter G. Ten Eyck	D	NY-28	March 4, 1921	Previously served 1913–15 while in the House. Last term while serving in the House.
332	Roy O. Woodruff	R	MI-10	March 4, 1921	Previously served (Progressive) 1913–15 while in the House.
One term
333	Martin C. Ansorge	R	NY-21	March 4, 1921	Only term while serving in the House.
334	T. Frank Appleby	R	NJ-3	March 4, 1921	Only term while serving in the House until 69th Congress.
335	Samuel S. Arentz	R	NV-al	March 4, 1921	Only term while serving in the House until 69th Congress.
336	William O. Atkeson	R	MO-6	March 4, 1921	Only term while serving in the House.
337	Joseph D. Beck	R	WI-7	March 4, 1921	
338	Carroll L. Beedy	R	ME-1	March 4, 1921	
339	Richard E. Bird	R	KS-8	March 4, 1921	Only term while serving in the House.
340	Harris J. Bixler	R	PA-28	March 4, 1921	
341	Charles G. Bond	R	NY-8	March 4, 1921	Only term while serving in the House.
342	Vincent M. Brennan	R	MI-13	March 4, 1921	Only term while serving in the House.
343	Joseph E. Brown	R	TN-3	March 4, 1921	Only term while serving in the House.
344	Alfred L. Bulwinkle	D	NC-9	March 4, 1921	
345	Olger B. Burtness	R	ND-1	March 4, 1921	
346	John L. Cable	R	OH-4	March 4, 1921	
347	William W. Chalmers	R	OH-9	March 4, 1921	Only term while serving in the House until 69th Congress
348	Frank Clague	R	MN-2	March 4, 1921	
349	John D. Clarke	R	NY-34	March 4, 1921	
350	Wynne F. Clouse	R	TN-4	March 4, 1921	Only term while serving in the House.
351	George P. Codd	R	MI-1	March 4, 1921	Only term while serving in the House.
352	Don B. Colton	R	UT-1	March 4, 1921	
353	Ross A. Collins	D	MS-5	March 4, 1921	
354	Charles R. Connell	R	PA-10	March 4, 1921	Died on September 26, 1922, while still serving in the House.
355	James J. Connolly	R	PA-5	March 4, 1921	
356	Clarence D. Coughlin	R	PA-11	March 4, 1921	Chairman: Expenditures in the Commerce Department. Only term while serving in the House.
357	Joseph T. Deal	D	VA-2	March 4, 1921	
358	William J. Driver	D	AR-1	March 4, 1921	
359	Charles L. Faust	R	MO-4	March 4, 1921	
360	E. Hart Fenn	R	CT-1	March 4, 1921	
361	Roy G. Fitzgerald	R	OH-3	March 4, 1921	
362	William H. Frankhauser	R	MI-3	March 4, 1921	Died on May 9, 1921, while still serving in the House.
363	Arthur M. Free	R	CA-8	March 4, 1921	
364	Louis A. Frothingham	R	MA-14	March 4, 1921	
365	Hampton P. Fulmer	D	SC-7	March 4, 1921	
366	Frank H. Funk	R	IL-17	March 4, 1921	
367	Harry C. Gahn	R	OH-21	March 4, 1921	Only term while serving in the House.
368	Lorraine M. Gensman	R	OK-6	March 4, 1921	Only term while serving in the House.
369	Fred B. Gernerd	R	PA-13	March 4, 1921	Only term while serving in the House.
370	Ralph W. E. Gilbert	D	KY-8	March 4, 1921	
371	T. Alan Goldsborough	D	MD-1	March 4, 1921	
372	John J. Gorman	R	IL-6	March 4, 1921	Only term while serving in the House until 69th Congress
373	William C. Hammer	D	NC-7	March 4, 1921	
374	Harry B. Hawes	D	MO-11	March 4, 1921	
375	Manuel Herrick	R	OK-8	March 4, 1921	Only term while serving in the House.
376	John Philip Hill	R	MD-3	March 4, 1921	
377	Joseph H. Himes	R	OH-16	March 4, 1921	Only term while serving in the House.
378	Michael J. Hogan	R	NY-7	March 4, 1921	Only term while serving in the House.
379	Theodore W. Hukriede	R	MO-9	March 4, 1921	Only term while serving in the House.
380	John C. Ketcham	R	MI-4	March 4, 1921	
381	William H. Kirkpatrick	R	PA-26	March 4, 1921	Only term while serving in the House.
382	John Kissel	R	NY-3	March 4, 1921	Only term while serving in the House.
383	Ardolph L. Kline	R	NY-5	March 4, 1921	Only term while serving in the House.
384	I. Clinton Kline	R	PA-16	March 4, 1921	Only term while serving in the House.
385	Charles L. Knight	R	OH-14	March 4, 1921	Only term while serving in the House.
386	William F. Kopp	R	IA-1	March 4, 1921	
387	Stanley H. Kunz	D	IL-8	March 4, 1921	
388	Oscar J. Larson	R	MN-8	March 4, 1921	
389	Henry F. Lawrence	R	MO-3	March 4, 1921	Only term while serving in the House.
390	Elmer O. Leatherwood	R	UT-2	March 4, 1921	
391	Warren I. Lee	R	NY-6	March 4, 1921	Only term while serving in the House.
...	Walter F. Lineberger	R	CA-9	March 4, 1921	Special election, before the start of the Congress: February 15, 1921
392	W. Turner Logan	D	SC-1	March 4, 1921	
393	Bill G. Lowrey	D	MS-2	March 4, 1921	
394	Homer L. Lyon	D	NC-6	March 4, 1921	
395	Robert S. Maloney	R	MA-7	March 4, 1921	Only term while serving in the House.
396	Washington J. McCormick	R	MT-1	March 4, 1921	Only term while serving in the House.
397	John J. McSwain	D	SC-4	March 4, 1921	
398	M. Alfred Michaelson	R	IL-7	March 4, 1921	
399	Ogden L. Mills	R	NY-17	March 4, 1921	
400	Frank C. Millspaugh	R	MO-1	March 4, 1921	Resigned on December 5, 1922, while still serving in the House.
401	Néstor Montoya	R	NM-al	March 4, 1921	[H] Died on January 13, 1923, while still serving in the House.
402	Allen F. Moore	R	IL-19	March 4, 1921	
403	William M. Morgan	R	OH-17	March 4, 1921	
404	Miner G. Norton	R	OH-20	March 4, 1921	Only term while serving in the House.
405	Charles F.X. O'Brien	D	NJ-12	March 4, 1921	
406	Archibald E. Olpp	R	NJ-11	March 4, 1921	Only term while serving in the House.
407	Tilman B. Parks	D	AR-7	March 4, 1921	
408	Roscoe C. Patterson	R	MO-7	March 4, 1921	Only term while serving in the House.
409	Randolph Perkins	R	NJ-6	March 4, 1921	
410	Andrew N. Petersen	R	NY-9	March 4, 1921	Only term while serving in the House.
411	Joseph C. Pringey	R	OK-4	March 4, 1921	Only term while serving in the House.
412	John E. Rankin	D	MS-1	March 4, 1921	
413	B. Carroll Reece	R	TN-1	March 4, 1921	
414	Sidney C. Roach	R	MO-8	March 4, 1921	
415	Alice M. Robertson	R	OK-2	March 4, 1921	[F] Only term while serving in the House.
416	Benjamin L. Rosenbloom	R	WV-1	March 4, 1921	
417	Albert B. Rossdale	R	NY-23	March 4, 1921	Only term while serving in the House.
418	Thomas J. Ryan	R	NY-15	March 4, 1921	Only term while serving in the House.
419	Morgan G. Sanders	D	TX-3	March 4, 1921	
420	John N. Sandlin	D	LA-4	March 4, 1921	
421	Lon A. Scott	R	TN-8	March 4, 1921	Only term while serving in the House.
422	Guy L. Shaw	R	IL-20	March 4, 1921	Only term while serving in the House.
423	Samuel A. Shelton	R	MO-16	March 4, 1921	Only term while serving in the House.
424	John C. Speaks	R	OH-12	March 4, 1921	
425	Elliott W. Sproul	R	IL-3	March 4, 1921	
426	Fletcher B. Swank	D	OK-5	March 4, 1921	
427	Philip D. Swing	R	CA-11	March 4, 1921	
428	Herbert W. Taylor	R	NJ-8	March 4, 1921	Only term while serving in the House until 69th Congress
429	John R. Tyson	D	AL-2	March 4, 1921	
430	Charles L. Underhill	R	MA-9	March 4, 1921	
431	Charles F. Van de Water	R	CA-9	March 4, 1921	Died as Representative-elect: November 20, 1920
432	Hallett S. Ward	D	NC-1	March 4, 1921	
433	William Williamson	R	SD-3	March 4, 1921	
434	Harry M. Wurzbach	R	TX-14	March 4, 1921	
435	Adam M. Wyant	R	PA-22	March 4, 1921	
Members joining the House, after the start of the Congress
...	Lamar Jeffers	D	AL-4	June 7, 1921	Special election
...	John M. C. Smith	R	MI-3	June 28, 1921	Previously served 1911–21 while in the House. Special election.
...	Cyrenus Cole	R	IA-5	July 19, 1921	Special election
...	Thomas S. Crago	R	PA-al	September 20, 1921	Previously served 1911–13 and 1915–21 while in the House. Special election. Last term while serving in the House.
...	A. Piatt Andrew, Jr.	R	MA-6	September 27, 1921	Special election
...	Chester W. Taylor	D	AR-6	October 25, 1921	Special election. Only term while serving in the House.
...	James M. Hooker	D	VA-5	November 8, 1921	Special election
...	John E. Nelson	R	ME-3	March 20, 1922	Special election
...	Henry S. Tucker	D	VA-10	March 21, 1922	Previously served 1889–97 while in the House. Special election.
...	Lewis Henry	R	NY-37	April 11, 1922	Special election. Only term while serving in the House.
...	Guinn Williams	D	TX-13	May 22, 1922	Special election
...	Charles L. Abernethy	D	NC-3	November 7, 1922	Special election
...	Charles L. Gifford	R	MA-16	November 7, 1922	Special election
...	Augustin R. Humphrey	R	NE-6	November 7, 1922	Special election. Only term while serving in the House.
...	Winnifred S. M. Huck	R	IL-al	November 7, 1922	[F] Special election. Only term while serving in the House.
...	James H. MacLafferty	R	CA-6	November 7, 1922	Special election
...	Roy H. Thorpe	R	NE-1	November 7, 1922	Special election. Only term while serving in the House.
...	Clarence W. Turner	D	TN-7	November 7, 1922	Special election. Only term while serving in the House until 73rd Congress
...	John Paul	R	VA-7	December 15, 1922	Seated after election contest. Only term while serving in the House.
...	Mae E. Nolan	R	CA-5	January 23, 1923	[F] Special election
Non voting members
a	Jonah K. Kalaniana'ole	R	HI-al	March 4, 1903	[AP] Territorial Delegate. Died on January 7, 1922, while still serving in the House.
b	Jaime C. De Veyra	N	PI-al	March 4, 1917	[AP] Resident Commissioner. Nationalist Party (PI). Last term while serving in the House.
c	Félix Córdova Dávila	U	PR-al	August 7, 1917	[H] Resident Commissioner. Unionist Party (PR).
d	Isauro Gabaldon	N	PI-al	March 4, 1920	[AP] Resident Commissioner. Nationalist Party (PI).
e	Daniel A. Sutherland	R	AK-al	March 4, 1921	Territorial Delegate
f	Henry Baldwin	R	HI-al	March 25, 1922	Territorial Delegate. Special election. Only term while serving in the House.

== See also ==
- 67th United States Congress
- List of United States congressional districts
- List of United States senators in the 67th Congress
