= Shelby Stephenson =

American poet (born 1938)

- Born: June 14, 1938 (age 88); Benson, Johnston County, North Carolina
- Education: UNC–Chapel Hill; University of Pittsburgh; University of Wisconsin
- Occupation: poet
- Spouse: Linda Letchworth "Nin" Wilson
- Children: Kate Whittington; Jacob Stephenson
- Writing career
- Language: English
- Notable awards: North Carolina Award (2001); Gilbert-Chappell Distinguished Poet (2004-2005); North Carolina Poet Laureate (2014-2018)

Shelby Stephenson (born June 14, 1938) is an American poet. On December 22, 2014, he was named by Governor Pat McCrory as the ninth North Carolina Poet Laureate, a position he held from 2014 to 2016.

== Biography ==
Stephenson was born in Benson, Johnston County, North Carolina to Maytle and Paul Stephenson in 1938, and lived for fourteen years with his parents and three older siblings Paul, Marshall, and Rose Stephenson in a rural farmhouse known as "Plankhouse." In 1952, the Stephensons moved to a new house, and Shelby graduated from high school in 1956; he earned his bachelor's degree from the University of North Carolina at Chapel Hill in 1960, his master's degree from the University of Pittsburgh in 1967, and his Doctorate from the University of Wisconsin in 1974. He met his wife, Linda Letchworth "Nin" Wilson, on a blind date in 1963, and the two married in 1966.

He moved back to North Carolina in the 1970s and went on to become a teacher, serving as the English department chair at Campbell College from 1974 to 1978 before becoming a professor of English at the University of North Carolina at Pembroke and the editor of Pembroke Magazine from 1978 until retiring in 2010. From 2004 to 2005, he was the Gilbert-Chappell Distinguished Poet. He currently lives with his Norwich Terrier named Cricket, while his ailing wife lives in an extended care facility in Smithfield.

In October 2014, Stephenson was inducted into the North Carolina Literary Hall of Fame, along with Betty Adcock, Ronald H. Bayes, and Jaki Shelton Green. He was later installed as the state's new poet laureate on February 2, 2015, in a ceremony at the State Capitol with Governor Pat McCrory, Cultural Resources Secretary Susan Kluttz, and Wayne Martin, Executive Director of the North Carolina Arts Council.

Stephenson hopes to pursue three projects during his tenure as state laureate: holding writing workshops in assisted living and retirement communities, raising awareness of local archives and family histories, and promoting writings about farming and farm life in North Carolina. He corresponded with literary critic M. Bernetta Quinn.

== Poet Laureate ==
Following the controversy surrounding the appointment of former state Laureate Valerie Macon, Governor McCrory said: "I've learned my lesson. It's been a learning process for me, too." Secretary Kluttz said: "I am thrilled at the choice of Shelby Stephenson as North Carolina's poet laureate," said Susan Kluttz, secretary of the N.C. Department of Cultural Resources. "He received many strong nominations, backed up by his impressive resume. He is a wonderful representative of the outstanding poets that flourish in our state. I look forward to working with him in the coming years."

Former Poet Laureate Kathryn Stripling Byer also said: "He's just good, both as a person and as a poet. ... His poetic voice just flows like a spring. He's a natural and we really need a voice like his right now with all the divisions we have in this state", adding that "the choice is brilliant, and I am rejoicing in the news. Shelby is a longtime friend, a powerful voice in North Carolina literature. A singer, an old-time raconteur, a poet attuned to the rhythms of our state and its people. I offer my joyful congratulations to one of our state's literary treasures. This is a splendid Christmas gift to North Carolinians, all of us. And for those who keep saying they don't like poetry, just wait till you hear Shelby. You will change your mind in a flash."

== Bibliography ==
Stephenson published his first poem, "Whales Are Hard to See," in the Davidson Miscellany 1973.

=== Poetry ===
- Middle Creek Poems. Laurinburg, N.C.: Blue Coot Press, 1979.
- Carolina Shout!: Poems. Greenville, N.C.: Greenville Printing Co., 1985.
- Finch’s Mash: Poems. Laurinburg, N.C.: St. Andrews Press, 1990.
- The Persimmon Tree Carol. Troy, Maine.: Nightshade Press, 1990.
- Plankhouse, with photographs by Roger Manley. Rocky Mount, N.C.: North Carolina Wesleyan College Press, 1993.
- Poor People: Poems. Troy, Maine: Nightshade Press, 1998.
- The Past. Hillsborough, N.C.: S. Stephenson, 1999.
- Fiddledeedee. Washington, D.C.: Bunny and the Crocodile Press, 2001.
- Greatest Hits, 1978-2000. Johnstown, Ohio: Pudding House Publications, 2002.
- Possum. Treadwell, N.Y.: Bright Hill Press, 2004.
- Family Matters: Homage to July, the Slave Girl. Durham, N.C.: Bellday Books, 2008.
- Playing Dead: Poems. Georgetown, Kentucky.: Finishing Line Press, 2011.
- Play My Music Anyhow: Poems. Georgetown, Kentucky.: Finishing Line Press, 2013.
- The Hunger of Freedom. Princeton, N.J.: Red Dashboard LLC Publishing, 2014.
- Maytle’s World. Chapel Hill Press, 2015.
- Elegies for Small Game. Press 53, 2016.
- Nin’s Poem. St. Andrews University Press, 2018.
- Our World. Press 53, 2018.
- Slavery and Freedom on Paul’s Hill. Press 53, 2019.
- Shelby’s Lady: The Hog Poems. Fernwood Press, 2020.
- Praises. Main Street Rag Publishing Company, 2021.

=== Music ===
- Hank Williams Tribute
- Sing the Old Songs (2004)
- When Country Was Country (2007)
- Sing Don Gibson (2012)
