= Rutherford College, North Carolina =

- Town
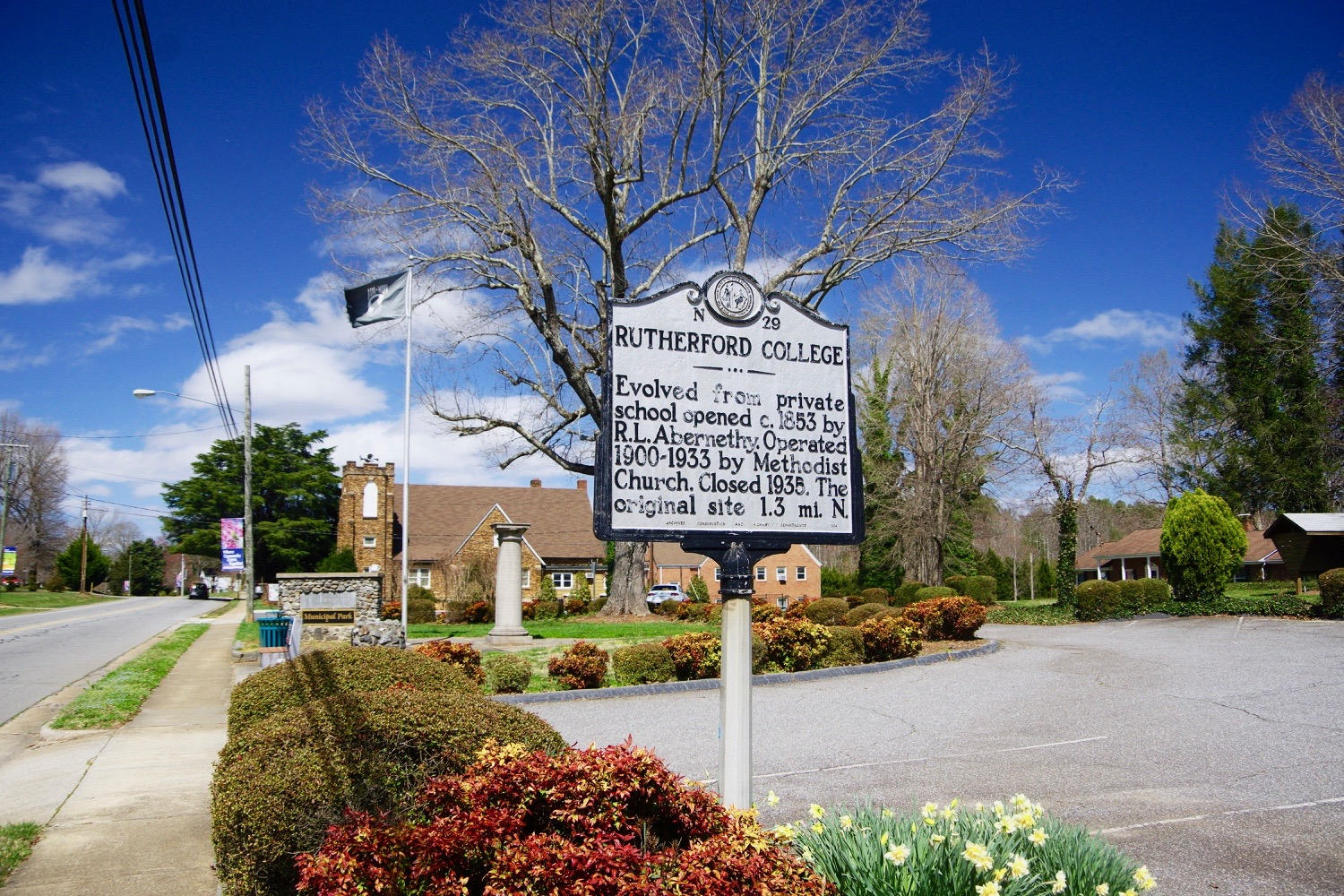
- Historical marker along Malcolm Boulevard

- Flag Seal
- Motto: "Small but unique and moving forward"
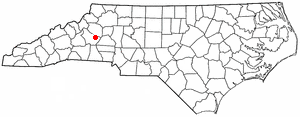
- Location of Rutherford College, North Carolina
- Coordinates: 35°44′27″N 81°31′31″W
- Country: United States
- State: North Carolina
- County: Burke, Caldwell

Area
  - Total: 2.30 sq mi (5.95 km^{2})
  - Land: 2.30 sq mi (5.95 km^{2})
  - Water: 0 sq mi (0.00 km^{2})
- Elevation: 1,217 ft (371 m)

Population (2020)
  - Total: 1,226
  - Density: 533.6/sq mi (206.04/km^{2})
- Time zone: UTC-5 (Eastern (EST))
  - Summer (DST): UTC-4 (EDT)
- ZIP code: 28671
- Area code: 828
- FIPS code: 37-58440
- GNIS feature ID: 2407261
- Website: www.rutherfordcollegenc.us

Rutherford College is a town in Burke County, North Carolina, United States. As of the 2020 census, Rutherford College had a population of 1,226. It is part of the Hickory–Lenoir–Morganton metropolitan area. There are multiple exclaves of the town in Caldwell County, North Carolina.

== History ==
The town was named for the college that was once located there, Rutherford College, which operated from the 1850s until the 1930s. The campus was later purchased by Valdese General Hospital.

== Geography ==
Rutherford College is located in eastern Burke County. It is bordered by Valdese to the west and Connelly Springs to the east.

U.S. Route 70 passes east–west through the southern part of town, and Interstate 40 passes through the southernmost section of the town, with access from exit 113. Morganton, the county seat, is 9 miles (14 km) to the west, and Hickory is 12 miles (19 km) to the east. The town is 65 miles (105 km) east of Asheville, 66 miles (106 km) northwest of Charlotte, and 184 miles (296 km) west of the North Carolina state capital of Raleigh.

According to the United States Census Bureau, the town has a total area of 2.3 square miles (5.9 km^{2}), all of it land.

== Demographics ==
Historical population
Census	Pop.	Note	%±
1910	229		—
1920	275		20.1%
1930	330		20.0%
1980	1,108		—
1990	1,126		1.6%
2000	1,293		14.8%
2010	1,341		3.7%
2020	1,226		−8.6%
U.S. Decennial Census

=== 2020 census ===
Rutherford College racial composition
Race	Number	Percentage
White (non-Hispanic)	1,115	90.95%
Black or African American (non-Hispanic)	17	1.39%
Native American	1	0.08%
Asian	30	2.45%
Other/Mixed	27	2.2%
Hispanic or Latino	36	2.94%

As of the 2020 United States census, there were 1,226 people, 534 households, and 358 families residing in the town.

=== 2000 census ===
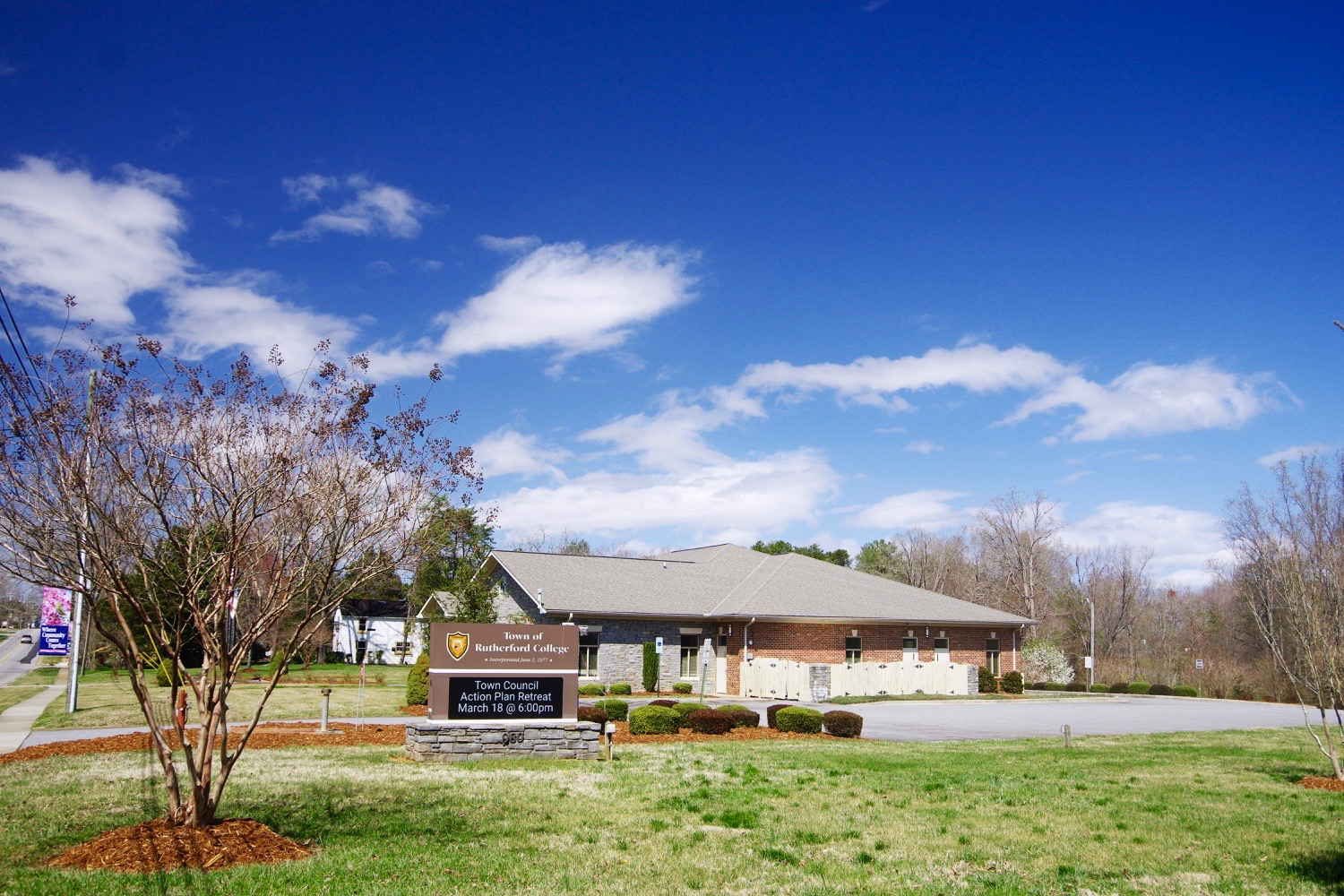
Town hall

As of the census of 2000, there were 1,293 people, 541 households, and 381 families residing in the town. The population density was 568.0 inhabitants per square mile (219.3/km^{2}). There were 570 housing units at an average density of 250.4 per square mile (96.7/km^{2}). The racial makeup of the town was 93.74% White, 0.39% African American, 0.31% Native American, 4.25% Asian, 0.15% from other races, and 1.16% from two or more races. Hispanic or Latino of any race were 0.62% of the population.

There were 541 households, out of which 29.8% had children under the age of 18 living with them, 55.6% were married couples living together, 11.5% had a female householder with no husband present, and 29.4% were non-families. 26.2% of all households were made up of individuals, and 11.6% had someone living alone who was 65 years of age or older. The average household size was 2.37 and the average family size was 2.86.

In the town, the population was spread out, with 23.7% under the age of 18, 7.4% from 18 to 24, 28.2% from 25 to 44, 25.0% from 45 to 64, and 15.8% who were 65 years of age or older. The median age was 39 years. For every 100 females, there were 84.5 males. For every 100 females age 18 and over, there were 82.8 males.

The median income for a household in the town was $36,579, and the median income for a family was $42,206.

== Education ==
All of Burke County is in the Burke County Public Schools.

The small portions in Caldwell County are within the Caldwell County Schools school district.

== Notable people ==
- Arthur Talmage Abernethy (1872–1956), journalist, minister, scholar; first North Carolina Poet Laureate
- Charles Laban Abernethy (1872–1955), lawyer, congressman from North Carolina
- Razor Ledbetter (1894–1969), former MLB pitcher
- Bascom Lamar Lunsford (1882–1973), folklorist, lawyer
