= Arthur Talmage Abernethy =

American journalist, scholar, theologian and poet

- Born: October 10, 1872; Rutherford College, North Carolina
- Died: May 15, 1956 (aged 83); Asheville, North Carolina
- Resting place: Rutherford College Cemetery
- Education: Rutherford College, A.B. Trinity College, A.M. Johns Hopkins University, PhD
- Occupations: Writer, theologian, poet
- Spouse: Edna Beatty (Lachot)
- Relatives: Robert Labon Abernethy (father), Mary Ann Hayes (mother)
- Writing career
- Language: English
- Genres: Theology, biography, poetry
- Notable awards: North Carolina Poet Laureate

Arthur Talmage Abernethy (October 10, 1872 – May 15, 1956) was a writer, theologian, and poet. He pastored several churches, contributed articles and poems to newspapers around the United States, and was named by Governor R. Gregg Cherry as the first North Carolina Poet Laureate in 1948.

== Biography ==
=== Early life and education ===
Abernethy was born October 10, 1872, in Rutherford College, North Carolina, a town named for the college of which his grandfather was founder and president. Born the fifth son to Rev. Robert Laban and Mary Ann Hayes Abernethy. Arthur proved to be a precocious child, teaching himself telegraphy by the age of nine and passing the exams to get his A.B. degree from Rutherford at the age of 14. He was denied this degree, however, due to his age. He remained at Rutherford College becoming professor of Latin in 1887 (making him one of the youngest professors in the nation), teaching there for several years. Already a Latin and Greek scholar, he went on to receive his A.M. degree from Trinity College (now Duke University) in 1891 and his doctoral degree from Johns Hopkins University.

=== Journalism and activism ===
Abernethy soon turned his attention to journalism, becoming editor of The Telegrapher from 1895 to 1897 and a biographical writer for The Philadelphia Record from 1897 to 1899. He befriended Edgar Wilson Nye who was an adviser to him. He contributed columns to The Charlotte Observer as well as newspapers around the country including Milwaukee, Pittsburgh, New York and Philadelphia. Some of his work appeared in Collier's Weekly.

He married several times, the last time to widow Edna Beatty Lachot of Pennsylvania. She had two children and Abernethy adopted her daughter Anna Mary. He met his wife while serving as business manager for the Philadelphia College of Commerce.

Abernethy was active in politics and the Prohibition movement. He ran for United States House of Representatives in 1928 as an anti-Al Smith candidate, losing in the Democratic primary to incumbent Alfred L. Bulwinkle.

A member of the Ku Klux Klan, Abernethy vowed in 1922 that a million American Klansmen were set to invade Canada to bring Matthew Bullock, a black North Carolinian whose brother had been lynched the prior year, back to the state. Bullock, who had been allowed to remain in Canada after entering the country illegally, went into hiding as a result of threats from Abernethy and other white supremacists.

He was instrumental in helping establish a Carnegie library in Rutherford College, the first free public library in Burke County.

In 1938, US President Franklin D. Roosevelt named him an "American Ambassador of Sunshine." That same year, Governor Clyde R. Hoey declared Abernethy to be an honorary citizen for life of Charlotte, Hickory, Asheville, and Valdese, North Carolina.

=== The Jew a Negro ===
In 1910 Abernathy published, The Jew a Negro: Being a Study of the Jewish Ancestry from an Impartial Standpoint. The book argues Jews are essentially of African descent. Abernathy claims, citing his own research as well as “ethnology” and “Scriptural proofs,” that ancient Jews intermarried and mixed extensively with African peoples and that there are few substantial differences between Jewish and “Negro” peoples. He argued that as Jews migrated to more temperate climates, their skin color lightened and they began to gain social and economic success, but that their fundamental racial connection to Black people persisted.

The book contends that Jews of Abernathy's time displayed similarities to Black people not only in physical characteristics but also in “habits and tendencies.” Abernathy’s work was part of a broader, now discredited, early 20th-century literature that attempted to associate Jews with African ancestry based on pseudoscience.

This viewpoint has been cited as evidence, especially within Black Hebrew Israelite movements, of the direct descent of African Americans from ancient Israelites. Abernathy’s thesis and similar works have been widely criticized by historians and the mainstream Jewish community as being based on flawed and prejudiced interpretations.

=== Later life and poet laureateship ===
Abernethy turned to the ministry later in life, becoming pastor of several churches including First Methodist Church, Belmont, New York; a church in Cincinnati, Ohio; and just prior to retirement, Asheville Christian Church. He returned to North Carolina, becoming mayor of the town of Rutherford College for a time and a magistrate. As magistrate and later, Justice of the Peace, he frequently filed his reports with the Clerk of Court in verse.

Throughout his life, Abernethy wrote many books and had many poems published. By his own account, he had written 50 books and over 3,000 poems. Abernethy was close friends with North Carolina Governor R. Gregg Cherry who appointed him to the poet laureate position in November 1948. Originally, the term of office was supposed to last only a few weeks—until the end of Cherry's governorship—but Abernethy was reappointed by the next governor, William Kerr Scott, remaining in the post until Governor William B. Umstead appointed James Larkin Pearson. It is notable that even though he was named poet laureate, Abernethy had never published any poetry in book form.

Abernethy died in Asheville, North Carolina on May 15, 1956, and is buried at Rutherford College Cemetery.

== Notable relatives ==
He was a cousin to Charles Laban Abernethy, a Democratic congressman from North Carolina.

== Works ==
Abernethy wrote many books, generally of a religious nature, but was best known for his regional stories and sketches.

- The Hell You Say!: A Novel (1893)
- Mechanics and Practice of Electric Telegraph (1891)
- Bertie and Clara (1896)
- The Jew a Negro; Being a Study of the Jewish Ancestry from an Impartial Standpoint Dixie Publishing Company, Moravian Falls, North Carolina (1910)
- Center-Shots at Sin (1918)
- Twenty-five Best Sermons (1920)
- Moonshine: Being Appalachia's Arabian Nights (1924)
- The Apostles' Creed: A Romance in Religion (1925)
- Christian's Treasure Island: A Restoration Romance (1927)
- A Royal Southern Family (historical romance based on his family history; 1934)
- Where are Our Dead? (1935)

Abernethy also authored pamphlets including:

- Did Washington Aspire to be King? (1910)
