= Graham A. Barden =

American politician (1896–1967)

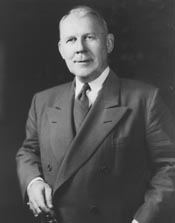

Member of the U.S. House of Representatives from North Carolina's 3rd district
- In office January 3, 1935 – January 3, 1961
- Preceded by: Charles Laban Abernethy
- Succeeded by: David N. Henderson

Personal details
- Born: Graham Arthur Barden; September 25, 1896 Sampson County, North Carolina, US
- Died: January 29, 1967 (aged 70) New Bern, North Carolina, US
- Party: Democratic

Graham Arthur Barden (September 25, 1896 – January 29, 1967) was an American lawyer, jurist, and World War II veteran who served as a U.S. representative from North Carolina between 1935 and 1961 for the Democratic Party.

== Biography ==
Born in Sampson County, North Carolina in 1896, he moved to Burgaw, North Carolina at the age of 12, where he attended public schools. During World War I, Barden was a seaman in the United States Navy.

After leaving the navy in 1919, Barden attended the University of North Carolina at Chapel Hill, where he studied law and was admitted to the bar in 1920. After briefly practicing law and teaching high school that same year, he became a judge in the Craven County courts, a post he held until 1924.

In 1932, Barden was elected to the North Carolina House of Representatives.

=== Congress ===
Two years later, he won the first of thirteen consecutive terms in the United States House. During the 78th and 79th Congresses, he chaired the House Education Committee; after that committee merged to become the Education and Labor Committee, he again became chairman in the 81st, 82nd, 84th, 85th, and 86th sessions.

He was a signatory to the 1956 Southern Manifesto that opposed the desegregation of public schools ordered by the Supreme Court in Brown v. Board of Education.

=== Retirement and death ===
He chose not to stand for re-election in 1960 and died in New Bern, North Carolina in 1967.

=== Legacy ===
In 1979, Campbell University Press published a biography by Elmer L. Puryear.

Graham A. Barden Elementary School, in Havelock, North Carolina is named after him.

== Notes ==
U.S. House of Representatives
Preceded by Charles L. Abernethy	Member of the U.S. House of Representatives from North Carolina's 3rd congressional district 1935–1961	Succeeded by David N. Henderson
