= Last One Home =

- Cover of the 1984 Harper & Row edition
- Author: John Ehle
- Language: English
- Publication date: 1984

Last One Home is a 1984 crime novel written by John Ehle. The novel was Elhe's sixth and final book in his Appalachian series that traces the King family from The Land Breakers in 1779. It was published by Press 53, LLC. It is the sixth book in Ehle's six-novel epic about Western North Carolina, and follows his mountain characters from the World War I era around Asheville into modern times.
