= George E. Hood =

American politician

- Hood in 1917

Member of the U.S. House of Representatives from North Carolina's 3rd district
- In office March 4, 1915 – March 3, 1919
- Preceded by: John M. Faison
- Succeeded by: Samuel M. Brinson

Personal details
- Born: January 25, 1875 Goldsboro, North Carolina
- Died: March 8, 1960 (aged 85) Goldsboro, North Carolina
- Party: Democratic

George Ezekial Hood (January 25, 1875 – March 8, 1960) was a politician and former United States Representative from the U.S. state of North Carolina.

== Biography ==
Hood was born near Goldsboro, Wayne County, North Carolina. He attended public schools there and became a telegraph operator.

He studied law and was admitted to the bar of the Supreme Court of North Carolina in 1896 and commenced practice in Goldsboro. From 1899 to 1909, he was a captain and subsequently promoted to colonel in the Second Regiment of the North Carolina National Guard. Hood held several local, state and national political offices between 1896 and 1919, including a member of the United States House of Representatives. He then returned to practice law in Goldsboro.

Hood died in Goldsboro and is interred in Willow Dale Cemetery.

== Political career ==
- 1896–1900 - secretary of the Wayne County Democratic executive committee
- 1898–1900 - treasurer of Wayne County
- 1899–1901 - representative in the North Carolina House of Representatives
- 1901–1907 - mayor of Goldsboro
- 1912 - his name was presented as a candidate for Congress; he lost out at the nominating convention
- March 4, 1915 – March 3, 1919 - elected as a Democrat to the Sixty-fourth and Sixty-fifth Congresses; he was not a candidate for renomination in 1918

U.S. House of Representatives
| Preceded by John M. Faison | Member of the U.S. House of Representatives from North Carolina's 3rd congressional district 1915–1919 | Succeeded by Samuel M. Brinson |
