= Charles Laban Abernethy =

American politician (1872–1955)

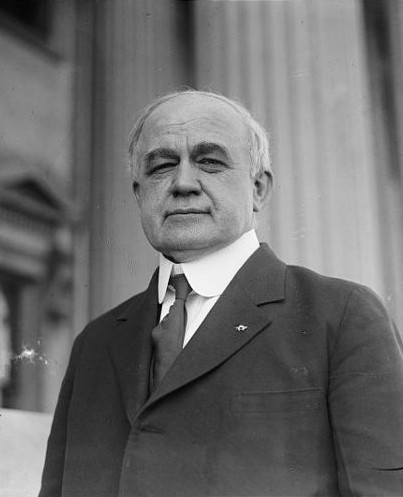

Member of the U.S. House of Representatives from North Carolina's 3rd district
- In office November 7, 1922 – January 3, 1935
- Preceded by: Samuel M. Brinson
- Succeeded by: Graham Arthur Barden

Personal details
- Born: March 18, 1872 Rutherford College, North Carolina, US
- Died: February 23, 1955 (aged 82) New Bern, North Carolina, US
- Party: Democratic

Charles Laban Abernethy (March 18, 1872 – February 23, 1955) was a Democratic U.S. Congressman from North Carolina between 1922 and 1935.

Born in Rutherford College, North Carolina, Abernethy attended local public schools in Rutherford College before moving to Beaufort, North Carolina in 1893. There, he founded the Beaufort Herald newspaper. Abernethy studied law at the University of North Carolina at Chapel Hill and was admitted to the bar in 1895. Practicing law in Beaufort, he was solicitor of the third (later the fifth) judicial circuit for twelve years, and a member of the executive committee of the North Carolina Democratic Party between 1898 and 1900.

Abernethy moved to New Bern, North Carolina in 1913, and continued to practice law there. In 1922, he was chosen, in a special election, to fill the seat vacated by the death of Rep. Samuel M. Brinson; he was re-elected to five more terms, serving between November 7, 1922 and January 3, 1935, before being defeated for re-election in 1934. After leaving Congress, he resumed his law practice, retiring in 1938.

Abernethy died in 1955 in New Bern.

He was a cousin to North Carolina's first Poet Laureate, Arthur Talmage Abernethy.

U.S. House of Representatives
Preceded by Samuel M. Brinson	Member of the U.S. House of Representatives from North Carolina's 3rd congressional district 1922–1935	Succeeded by Graham A. Barden
