= Valerie Macon =

American civil servant and poet (born 1950)

- Born: 1950 (age 75–76)
- Education: Adelphi University, Meredith College
- Occupations: civil servant, poet
- Writing career
- Notable awards: North Carolina Poet Laureate

Valerie Macon (born 1950) is an American civil servant and poet. She was named by Governor Pat McCrory as the eighth North Carolina Poet Laureate, a position she was set to hold from 2014 to 2016. Appointed on July 11, 2014, she resigned on July 17, 2014 amid controversy over the appointment. Macon continues to work for the state's Department of Health and Human Services as a Disability Examiner. Her two books of poetry prior to her appointment to North Carolina poet laureate were self-published in 2011 and 2014.

A third book, "A String of Black Pearls" was published by Main Street Rag Publishing in May 2015; a fourth book, "The Shape of Today" was published by Main Street Rag Publishing in 2018; a fifth book, "Page Turner" was published in 2021.

== Biography ==
Macon studied business at Adelphi University and also received a BA in English from Meredith College. She also has a degree in interior decorating. Macon lives in Fuquay-Varina, North Carolina and has worked as a court reporter and later as a disability determination specialist at the North Carolina Department of Health and Human Services since 1997. As of July 20, 2014, Macon was listed as Recording Secretary of the North Carolina Poetry Society.

== Awards ==
The governor's July 11 announcement indicated that Macon's books "Shelf Life" and "Sleeping Rough" were nominated for a Pushcart Prize.

== Controversy ==
Macon's qualifications for the position have been questioned and McCrory was criticized for bypassing the establishing process and making the appointment without consulting the North Carolina Arts Council for input. Kathryn Stripling Byer, the state's fifth poet laureate, acknowledged that while there is no law requiring the governor to consult with the Arts Council, the process has always been more open and democratic in the past.

McCrory later claimed that he was "not aware of the traditional process that was in place" for selecting the state's poet laureate. Macon subsequently resigned the post on July 18.

== Bibliography ==
Macon's initial work was published through Old Mountain Press of Sylva, North Carolina. A third book was published in May 2015 through Main Street Rag Publishing and received praise from Shelby Stephenson, the laureate appointed after Valerie Macon's resignation. It is entitled "A String of Black Pearls." A fourth book entitled "The Shape of Today" was published by Main Street Rag Publishing in 2018. "Page Turner" was published in 2021 and "Chasing After the Wind" in 2023.

=== Poetry ===
- 'Shelf Life' (2011)
- 'Sleeping Rough" (2014)
- "A String of Black Pearls" (2015) Main Street Rag
- "The Shape of Today" (2018) Main Street Rag
- "Page Turner"
- "Chasing After the Wind"
