= Cathy Smith Bowers =

American poet and professor

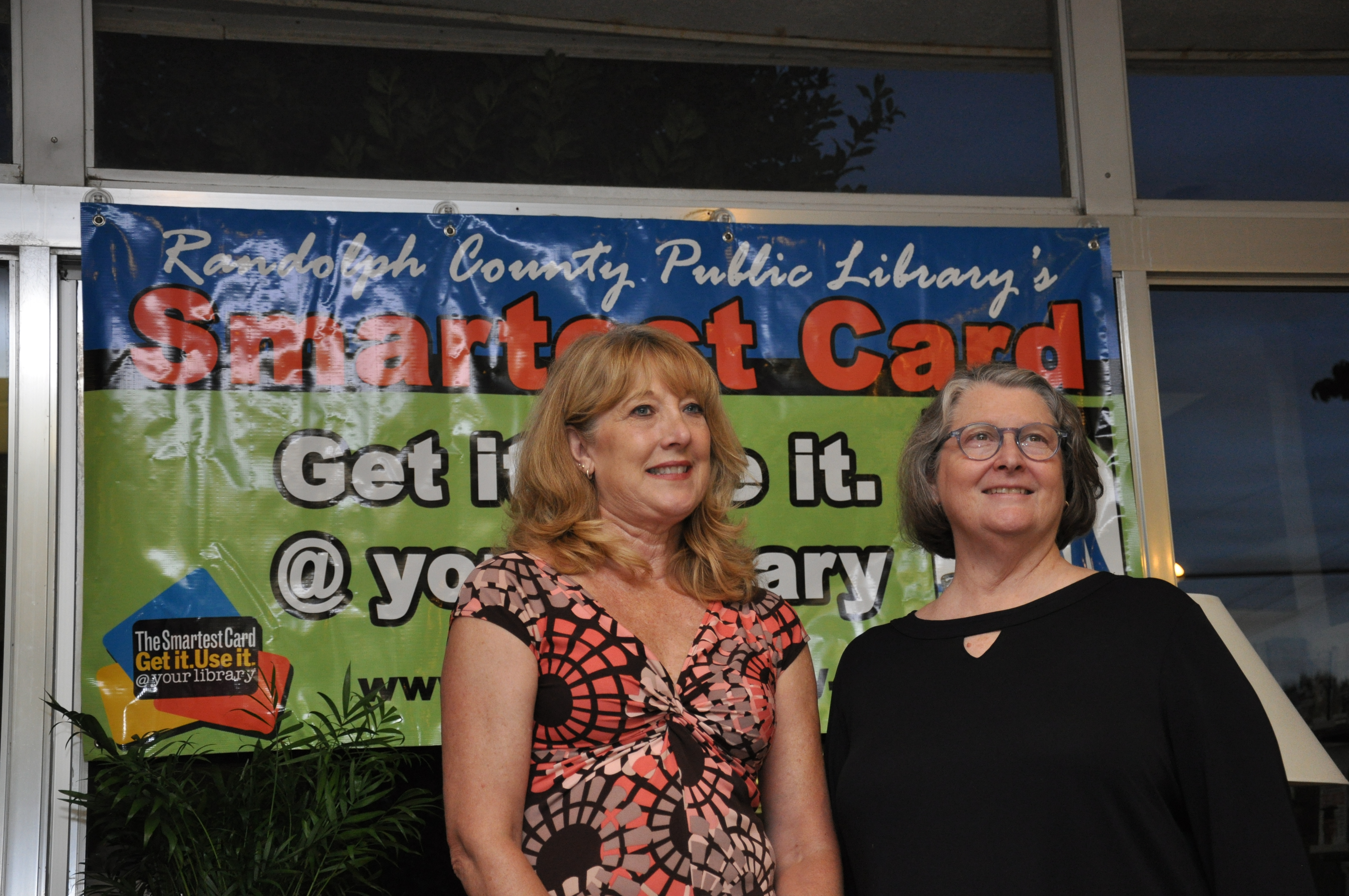
- Bowers (left) in 2010
- Born: 1949 (age 76–77); Lancaster, South Carolina
- Education: Winthrop University
- Occupations: Poet, professor
- Writing career
- Notable awards: North Carolina Poet Laureate

Cathy Smith Bowers (born 1949) is an American poet and professor. She teaches poetry in an M.F.A. program at Queens University of Charlotte. Bowers was named by Governor Bev Perdue as the sixth North Carolina Poet Laureate, 2010–2012. She has published five collections of poetry.

== Biography ==
=== Early life and education ===
Bowers was born in 1949, in the town of Lancaster, South Carolina. She went on to receive her bachelor's degree in 1972 and master's degree in 1976 (both in English) from Winthrop University in Rock Hill, South Carolina. In 1984, Bowers also attended the International Graduate Summer School at Exeter College at the University of Oxford.

=== Career ===
Bowers is currently an instructor in poetry in the M.F.A. program in Creative Writing at Queens University in Charlotte, North Carolina. She has been an instructor at Queens since 1983.

=== Poet laureateship ===
In 2010, North Carolina Governor Bev Perdue appointed Bowers as the new North Carolina Poet Laureate to succeed Kathryn Stripling Byer. She was also the judge for the North Carolina Poetry Society's Poet Laureate Award.

== Personal life ==
Bowers lives in Tryon, North Carolina. She "always wears flats" because she stands six feet tall already. Many of the major events in her life work their way into Bower's poetry, such as being estranged from her father; having a brother die of AIDS, as well as another of drug and alcohol abuse; and having her second husband commit suicide.

== Works ==
Bowers' poetry has appeared in various magazines and journals including The Atlantic Monthly, The Georgia Review, Poetry, The Southern Review, and The Kenyon Review. She has five collections of poetry published:

- The Love That Ended Yesterday in Texas (Lubbock, Texas: Texas Tech University Press, 1992)
- Traveling in Time of Danger (Iris Press, 1999)
- A Book of Minutes (Iris Press, 2004)
- The Candle I Hold Up To See You (Iris Press, 2009)
- Like Shining from Shook Foil (Press 53, 2010)

Bowers' essay "A Moment of Intensity" was featured in Poet's Market, 2007.

== Awards and honors ==
Bowers' awards and honors include:

- 1990 – General Electric Foundation Award for Young Writers
- 2002 – J.B. Fuqua Distinguished Educator Award, Queens University
- 2006, 2007 – Gilbert-Chappell Distinguished Poet Award, North Carolina Poetry Society
- 2010–2012 – North Carolina Poet Laureate
- 2011 – Savannah Book Festival, guest author
