= The Journey of August King =

1995 film by John Duigan

- Directed by: John Duigan
- Written by: John Ehle
- Based on: The Journey of August King by John Ehle
- Produced by: Nick Wechsler; Sam Waterston
- Starring: Jason Patric; Thandie Newton; Larry Drake; Sam Waterston
- Narrated by: Maya Angelou
- Cinematography: Slawomir Idziak
- Edited by: Humphrey Dixon
- Music by: Stephen Endelman
- Production company: Addis–Wechsler Productions
- Distributed by: Miramax Films
- Release dates: September 9, 1995 (Venice); November 10, 1995 (United States)
- Running time: 91 minutes
- Country: United States
- Language: English
- Box office: $14,381

The Journey of August King is a 1995 American drama film directed by John Duigan based on the 1971 novel of the same name by John Ehle, who also wrote the screenplay. It stars Jason Patric and Thandie Newton.

The film had its world premiere as the closing film of the 52nd edition of the Venice Film Festival on September 9, 1995; it was later screened at the Toronto International Film Festival on September 14, 1995, and at the Chicago International Film Festival on October 13, 1995. It was released in theaters in the United States on November 10, 1995.

== Cast ==
=== In opening credits ===
- Jason Patric
- Thandie Newton
- Larry Drake
- and Sam Waterston
- Nesbitt Blaisdell
- John Doman
- Terry Nienhuis
- Dean Rader Duvall
- Marlus Harding
- Eric Mabius
- Lisa Roberts
- Muse Watson
- Sara-Jane Wylde
- Narration read by Maya Angelou

=== In closing credits ===
- Jason Patric as August King
- Thandie Newton as Annalees
- Larry Drake as Olaf Singletary
- Sam Waterston as Mooney Wright
- Sara-Jane Wylde as Ida Wright
- Eric Mabius as Hal Wright
- Muse Watson as Zimmer
- John Doman as Bolton
- Andrew Stahl as Harrison
- Danny Nelson as Felix
- Collin Wilcox Paxton as Mina
- Dean Rader Duvall as Gabriel
- Billy Ray Reynolds as Ben
- Marlus C. Harding as Sims
- Lisa Roberts as Meg
- John Burnett Hall as Travis
- Roy Bush Laughter as Tom
- A. Duncan Shirley III as Porter
- Chase Conley as Harry (son)
- E. George Betz as Bridge Attendant
- Nesbitt Blaisdell as Mr. Cole
- Graham Paul as Wade
- Becky Vanselow as Shepherd's Daughter #1
- Summer Vanselow as Shepherd's Daughter #2
- Annie Vanselow as Shepherd's Daughter #3
- Rich Valliere as Jeffry
- Mitch Mulkey as Phillips
- Michael Flippo as Knight
- Ken Paul Jones as Ed
- Dale Dickey as Jenny
- Terry Nienhuis as Fisher
- Kirk Adcock as Fisher's Son
- Jon Huffman as Shepherd's Father
- Lee Norris as Silver Boy
- Andy Nichols as Younger Silver Boy
- John E. Davis as Waterston
- Dean Whitworth as Smith
- Jerry Rushing as Gudger
- George Lynch as Farmer
- Blaque Fowler as McTavish
- Keith Shepard as Drover #1
- Michael Mattison as Drover #2
- Elaine Stenett as Girl
- Larry Henderson as Promoter
- Mark Joy as Mark
- Shannon Shea as Bear Puppeteer
- Darwin Von Mitchell as August King Stunt Double

== Production ==
Miramax presold the Japanese distribution rights to Shochiku along with Gary Fleder's Things to Do in Denver When You're Dead, George T. Miller's Robinson Crusoe, Four Rooms, and Joe Chappelle's Halloween: The Curse of Michael Myers in a bulk acquisition deal.

== See also ==
- List of films featuring slavery
