= List of United States senators in the 67th Congress =

This is a complete list of United States senators during the 67th United States Congress listed by seniority from March 4, 1921, to March 3, 1923.

Order of service is based on the commencement of the senator's first term. Behind this is former service as a senator (only giving the senator seniority within their new incoming class), service as vice president, a House member, a cabinet secretary, or a governor of a state. The final factor is the population of the senator's state.

Senators who were sworn in during the middle of the Congress (up until the last senator who was not sworn in early after winning the November 1922 election) are listed at the end of the list with no number.

== Terms of service ==
Class	Terms of service of senators that expired in years
Class 1	Terms of service of senators that expired in 1923 (AZ, CA, CT, DE, FL, IN, MA, MD, ME, MI, MN, MO, MS, MT, ND, NE, NJ, NM, NV, NY, OH, PA, RI, TN, TX, UT, VA, VT, WA, WI, WV, and WY.)
Class 2	Terms of service of senators that expired in 1925 (AL, AR, CO, DE, GA, IA, ID, IL, KS, KY, LA, MA, ME, MI, MN, MS, MT, NC, NE, NH, NJ, NM, OK, OR, RI, SC, SD, TN, TX, VA, WV, and WY.)
Class 3	Terms of service of senators that expired in 1927 (AL, AR, AZ, CA, CO, CT, FL, GA, ID, IL, IN, IA, KS, KY, LA, MD, MO, NC, ND, NH, NV, NY, OH, OK, OR, PA, SC, SD, UT, VT, WA, and WI.)

== U.S. Senate seniority list ==
U.S. Senate seniority
Rank	Senator (party-state)	Seniority date	Other factors
1	Henry Cabot Lodge (R-MA)	March 4, 1893	
2	Francis E. Warren (R-WY)	March 4, 1895	Previously a senator
3	Knute Nelson (R-MN)	March 4, 1895	
4	Boies Penrose (R-PA)	March 4, 1897	
5	Charles A. Culberson (D-TX)	March 4, 1899	Former governor
6	Porter McCumber (R-ND)	March 4, 1899	
7	William P. Dillingham (R-VT)	October 18, 1900	
8	Furnifold M. Simmons (D-NC)	March 4, 1901	
9	Lee S. Overman (D-NC)	March 4, 1903	North Carolina 15th in population (1900)
10	Reed Smoot (R-UT)	March 4, 1903	Utah 41st in population (1900)
11	Frank B. Brandegee (R-CT)	May 10, 1905	
12	Robert M. La Follette, Sr. (R-WI)	January 4, 1906	
13	William Borah (R-ID)	March 4, 1907	
14	Robert Owen (D-OK)	December 11, 1907	
15	Carroll S. Page (R-VT)	October 21, 1908	
16	Albert B. Cummins (R-IA)	November 24, 1908	
17	Wesley Jones (R-WA)	March 4, 1909	Former representative
18	Ellison D. Smith (D-SC)	March 4, 1909	South Carolina 24th in population (1900)
19	Duncan U. Fletcher (D-FL)	March 4, 1909	Florida 33rd in population (1900)
20	Claude A. Swanson (D-VA)	August 1, 1910	
21	John S. Williams (D-MS)	March 4, 1911	Former representative (16 years)
22	Charles Townsend (D-MI)	March 4, 1911	Former representative (8 years)
23	Gilbert Hitchcock (D-NE)	March 4, 1911	Former representative (6 years)
24	Miles Poindexter (D-WA)	March 4, 1911	Former representative (2 years)
25	George P. McLean (R-CT)	March 4, 1911	Former governor
26	Atlee Pomerene (D-OH)	March 4, 1911	Ohio 4th in population (1910)
27	James A. Reed (D-MO)	March 4, 1911	Missouri 7th in population (1910)
28	Henry L. Myers (D-MT)	March 4, 1911	Montana 40th in population (1910)
29	William S. Kenyon (R-IA)	April 12, 1911	
30	Henry F. Ashurst (D-AZ)	March 27, 1912	
31	Key Pittman (D-NV)	January 29, 1913	
32	Morris Sheppard (D-TX)	February 3, 1913	
33	Joseph E. Ransdell (D-LA)	March 4, 1913	Former representative (14 years)
34	Joseph Robinson (R-AR)	March 4, 1913	Former representative (10 years), former governor
35	George W. Norris (R-NE)	March 4, 1913	Former representative (10 years)
36	John Shields (D-TN)	March 4, 1913	Tennessee 17th in population (1910)
37	Thomas Sterling (R-SD)	March 4, 1913	South Dakota 36th in population (1910)
38	LeBaron Colt (R-RI)	March 4, 1913	Rhode Island 38th in population (1910)
39	Thomas J. Walsh (D-MT)	March 4, 1913	Montana 40th in population (1910)
40	Charles Curtis (R-KS)	March 4, 1915	Previously a senator
41	Oscar Underwood (D-AL)	March 4, 1915	Former representative
42	James Wadsworth, Jr. (R-NY)	March 4, 1915	
43	Bert Fernald (R-ME)	September 12, 1916	
44	James Watson (R-IN)	November 8, 1916	
45	Philander C. Knox (R-PA)	March 4, 1917	Previously a senator
46	William M. Calder (R-NY)	March 4, 1917	Former representative (10 years)
47	Kenneth McKellar (D-TN)	March 4, 1917	Former representative (6 years)
48	Howard Sutherland (R-WV)	March 4, 1917	Former representative (4 years)
49	William H. King (D-UT)	March 4, 1917	Former representative (3 years)
50	Peter G. Gerry (D-RI)	March 4, 1917	Former representative (2 years)
51	Park Trammell (D-FL)	March 4, 1917	Former governor, Florida 33rd in population (1910)
52	John B. Kendrick (D-WY)	March 4, 1917	Former governor, Wyoming 47th in population (1910)
53	Harry S. New (R-IN)	March 4, 1917	Indiana 9th in population (1910)
54	Joseph S. Frelinghuysen (R-NJ)	March 4, 1917	New Jersey 11th in population (1910)
55	Frank B. Kellogg (R-MN)	March 4, 1917	Minnesota 19th in population (1910)
56	Joseph I. France (R-MD)	March 4, 1917	Maryland 27th in population (1910)
57	Frederick Hale (R-ME)	March 4, 1917	Maine 34th in population (1910)
58	Andrieus Jones (R-NM)	March 4, 1917	New Mexico 43rd in population (1910)
59	Josiah Wolcott (D-DE)	March 4, 1917	Delaware 46th in population (1910)
60	Hiram Johnson (R-CA)	March 16, 1917	
61	Irvine Lenroot (R-WI)	April 18, 1918	
62	Selden P. Spencer (R-MO)	November 6, 1918	Missouri 7th in population (1910)
63	George H. Moses (R-NH)	November 6, 1918	New Hampshire 39th in population (1910)
64	Charles L. McNary (R-OR)	December 18, 1918	
65	Heisler Ball (R-DE)	March 4, 1919	Previously a senator (2 years)
66	Davis Elkins (R-WV)	March 4, 1919	Previously a senator (1 year)
67	Medill McCormick (R-IL)	March 4, 1919	Former representative (2 years)
68	Truman Newberry (R-MI)	March 4, 1919	Former cabinet member
69	David I. Walsh (D-MA)	March 4, 1919	Former governor, Massachusetts 6th in population (1910)
70	Arthur Capper (R-KS)	March 4, 1919	Former governor, Kansas 22nd in population (1910)
71	Henry W. Keyes (R-NH)	March 4, 1919	Former governor, New Hampshire 39th in population (1910)
72	William J. Harris (D-GA)	March 4, 1919	Georgia 10th in population (1910)
73	Nathaniel Dial (D-SC)	March 4, 1919	South Carolina 26th in population (1910)
74	Lawrence C. Phipps (R-CO)	March 4, 1919	Colorado 32nd in population (1910)
75	Pat Harrison (D-MS)	March 5, 1919	
76	Augustus O. Stanley (D-KY)	May 19, 1919	Former representative (12 years)
77	Walter E. Edge (R-NJ)	May 19, 1919	
78	Carter Glass (D-VA)	February 2, 1920	
79	James Thomas Heflin (D-AL)	November 2, 1920	
80	Frank B. Willis (R-OH)	January 14, 1921	
81	Frank R. Gooding (R-ID)	January 15, 1921	
82	William B. McKinley (R-IL)	March 4, 1921	Former representative (14 years)
83	Thaddeus H. Caraway (D-AR)	March 4, 1921	Former representative (8 years)
84	Tom Watson (D-GA)	March 4, 1921	Former representative (2 years), Georgia 12th in population (1920)
85	John Harreld (R-OK)	March 4, 1921	Former representative (2 years), Oklahoma 21st in population (1920)
86	Ralph H. Cameron (R-AZ)	March 4, 1921	Former delegate
87	Peter Norbeck (R-SD)	March 4, 1921	Former governor, South Dakota 37th in population (1920)
88	Samuel M. Shortridge (R-CA)	March 4, 1921	California 8th in population (1920)
89	Richard P. Ernst (R-KY)	March 4, 1921	Kentucky 15th in population (1920)
90	Edwin S. Broussard (D-LA)	March 4, 1921	Louisiana 22nd in population (1920)
91	Ovington Weller (R-MD)	March 4, 1921	Maryland 28th in population (1920)
92	Samuel Nicholson (D-CO)	March 4, 1921	Colorado 33rd in population (1920)
93	Robert Stanfield (R-OR)	March 4, 1921	Oregon 34th in population (1920)
94	Edwin Ladd (R-ND)	March 4, 1921	North Dakota 36th in population (1920)
95	Tasker Oddie (R-NV)	March 4, 1921	Nevada 48th in population (1920)
	Holm O. Bursum (R-NM)	March 11, 1921	
	Coleman du Pont (R-DE)	July 7, 1921	
	William E. Crow (R-PA)	October 24, 1921	
	George W. Pepper (R-PA)	January 10, 1922	
	Charles Rawson (R-IA)	February 24, 1922	
	David A. Reed (R-PA)	August 8, 1922	
	Thomas F. Bayard, Jr. (D-DE)	November 7, 1922	
	Rebecca Felton (D-GA)	November 21, 1922	
	Walter F. George (D-GA)	November 22, 1922	
	James Couzens (R-MI)	November 29, 1922	
	Smith W. Brookhart (R-IA)	December 1, 1922	

== See also ==
- 67th United States Congress
- List of United States representatives in the 67th Congress
