= Razor Ledbetter =

American baseball player (1894–1969)

- Pitcher
- Born: December 8, 1894; Rutherford College, North Carolina, U.S.
- Died: February 1, 1969 (aged 74); West Palm Beach, Florida, U.S.
- Batted: Right Threw: Right

MLB debut
- April 16, 1915, for the Detroit Tigers

Last MLB appearance
- April 16, 1915, for the Detroit Tigers

MLB statistics
- Win–loss record: 0–0
- Strikeouts: 0
- Earned run average: 0.00
- Stats at Baseball Reference

Teams
- Detroit Tigers (1915)

Ralph Overton "Razor" Ledbetter (December 8, 1894 – February 1, 1969) was an American Major League Baseball pitcher who pitched one inning for the Detroit Tigers in April 1915. He also played 11 years in minor league baseball from 1913 to 1926.

Ledbetter was born in Rutherford College, North Carolina in 1894. He began playing professional baseball in the North Carolina State League in 1913. In 1914, he compiled a 26–12 record for the Charlotte Hornets.

After his 26-win season, Ledbetter joined the Detroit Tigers at the start of the 1915 season. On April 16, 1915, Ledbetter came in to pitch the top of the 9th inning in a home game against the Cleveland Indians at Navin Field. He pitched a scoreless inning, but the Tigers lost 9–6. He never appeared in another Major League game, although he did play for the Tigers in a May 10, 1915 exhibition game against the Cincinnati Reds. His lifetime ERA stands at 0.00.

Ledbetter returned to Charlotte for most of the 1915 season, compiling a record of 17–12. He continued to play in the minor leagues through the 1925 season, including stints with the Charlotte Hornets (1914–1915, 1920), Mobile Sea Gulls (1916), Little Rock Travelers (1917, 1919), St. Joseph Saints (1923–1924), and Durham Bulls (1924–1925). He compiled a 19–9 record in 1921. His career record in the minor leagues was 119–112.

Ledbetter died in West Palm Beach, Florida on February 1, 1969, at the age of 74.
