= Winter People =

1989 romantic drama film by Ted Kotcheff

- Theatrical release poster
- Directed by: Ted Kotcheff
- Screenplay by: Carol Sobieski
- Based on: The Winter People; 1982 novel by John Ehle
- Produced by: Robert H. Solo
- Starring: Kurt Russell; Kelly McGillis; Lloyd Bridges; Mitchell Ryan
- Cinematography: François Protat
- Edited by: Thom Noble
- Music by: John Scott
- Production companies: Nelson Entertainment; Castle Rock Entertainment (Uncredited)
- Distributed by: Columbia Pictures
- Release dates: January 12, 1989 (West Germany); April 14, 1989 (United States)
- Running time: 111 minutes
- Country: United States
- Language: English
- Budget: $10 million
- Box office: $2,023,282

Winter People is a 1989 American romantic-drama film directed by Ted Kotcheff, and starring Kurt Russell and Kelly McGillis. It is based on the novel by John Ehle. Wayland Jackson, a widower with a young daughter, moves to a small, impoverished mountain village in North Carolina, circa 1934. They are taken in by Collie Wright, a single mother, and she and Wayland soon fall in love.

== Plot ==
Young widowed clockmaker Wayland Jackson and his 12-year-old daughter, Paula, enter a small Depression-era community in the Appalachian Mountains literally by accident. Wayland becomes acquainted with Collie Wright (a single mother with a newborn child, Jonathan) who gives them shelter from the cold. As he becomes more familiar to the villagers, Wayland tries to persuade them that he could build a beautiful clock for the public square. His proposal is met with considerable skepticism, and then he is given the town's consent.

He is attracted to Collie, but their lives are threatened by family members from the Wright family's rival clan, the Campbells, led by patriarch Drury. The youngest son, Cole, is the father of Collie's baby. Cole wanted to run away with Collie but ultimately left her, fearing Drury's wrath. One night, Cole Campbell arrives in Collie's cabin, and goes into a violent rage once he learns of Collie and Wayland's relationship. Wayland and Cole get into a fistfight in the frozen pond near the cabin. Cole is found dead the next morning, whereupon his relatives demand that the Wrights now owe them a life. To save the lives of her brothers and Jackson, Collie gives them Cole's child.

Wayland and Collie soon are engaged. Wayland confronts the Campbells and attempts to persuade Drury and his clan to end their feud with the Wrights, but they chase him away. The following spring, Drury appears at the pair's wedding and returns Jonathan to his mother.

== Cast ==
- Kurt Russell as Wayland Jackson
- Kelly McGillis as Collie Wright
- Lloyd Bridges as William Wright
- Mitchell Ryan as Drury Campbell
- Jeffrey Meek as Cole Campbell
- Don Michael Paul as Young Wright
- Lanny Flaherty as Gudger Wright
- Eileen Ryan as Annie Wright
- Amelia Burnette as Paula Jackson
- David Dwyer as Milton Wright

== Production ==
Producer Robert H. Solo claimed he spent five years trying to get Winter People made attributing the lack of enthusiasm from potential investors to the film being a period piece. The budget for the film was $10 million. Production commenced in October 1987 before concluding in December of that year. The film was shot in Plumtree, North Carolina, near where source novel author John Ehle was born and raised, with the production using the town without any dressing to shoot the film. The only modification made by the production was a wooden bridge over a local stream. During production the crew faced inclement weather such as a flood washing away the bridge and strong winds tearing down parts of the set. Additional filming took place in Culver City, California, for two weeks of interior shots.

== Release ==
Winter People was initially intended to be released sometime around Thanksgiving 1988, but was ultimately released in the United States on April 14, 1989, where it opened in 14th place at 298 theaters with an opening weekend of $743,032 before ending its run with $2,023,282 well below its $10 million budget. Winter People was released to home video on October 26, 1989.

== Reception ==
=== Critical response ===
Winter People was poorly received by critics and has an overall approval rating of 20% on Rotten Tomatoes.
