= James Larkin Pearson =

American poet

- Born: James Larkin Pearson; September 13, 1879; Wilkes County, North Carolina
- Died: August 27, 1981 (aged 101); Wilkes County, North Carolina
- Occupations: poet and newspaper publisher
- Known for: Poet Laureate of North Carolina (1953–1981)

James Larkin Pearson (September 13, 1879 – August 27, 1981) was a poet and newspaper publisher. From 1953–1981 he served as North Carolina Poet Laureate, and was the second poet to hold the title.

== Biography ==
=== Early years ===
Pearson was born on September 13, 1879, in the Brushy Mountains of Wilkes County, North Carolina, about three miles from the town of Boomer. He was born in a log cabin on his parents’ farm. According to Pearson in his book My Fingers and My Toes, his first attempt at poetry came when he was four-and-a-half years old: "One cold winter day my father had me out with him and asked me, 'Jimmy, are you cold?' Without taking any time to study out my answer, it came like a flash:

My fingers and my toes,
my feet and my hands,
are jist as cold,
as you ever see'd a man's.

Larkin wanted to be a poet from his boyhood years, he later recalled.

Hailing from a poor family in rural North Carolina, Pearson's education was sub-optimal, having to trudge a mile each way to the schoolhouse in homemade shoes through all conditions. His time in the classroom was brief, he remembered:

"When all my school days were counted up, I hadn't had more than 12 or possibly 15 months of schooling, all in that one room free schoolhouse in the backwoods. We didn't have any grades, but I probably got to what would be the 7th grade. A few of the students were from well-to-do families, and they went on to high school and some of them to college. But I didn't go any further. There was no money, and I was a poor seedy-looking brat from a backwoods cabin and nobody expected me to amount to anything. It didn't matter whether I got an education or not."

However, he continued to educate himself, working his brain even as he was plowing on the family farm: "I always carried my notebook and my pencil with me, and as I trudged between the plow-handles in the hot sunshine, my mind was busy working out a poem." Driven by a love of learning, Pearson would become a great bibliophile over the course of his life, eventually accumulating a library of more than 4,000 volumes.

Pearson worked on the family farm until he was 21. He would later buy a farm of his own in Boomer, called "Fifty Acres," and would continue to live there for most of his adult life.

=== Newspaper publisher ===
Pearson became involved in the newspaper publishing business, becoming the editor of The Patriot of Jefferson, North Carolina.

In August 1900 Pearson took a position working with R. Don Laws on The Yellow Jacket, a newspaper which was distributed nationally and known for an orientation to working people and radical and iconoclastic political views. The paper was established by Laws in 1895, during the great depression of the 1890s in opposition to what was perceived as a era of Democratic party "starvation and free soup."

In May 1907 Pearson married Cora Wallace.

In 1910 Pearson began publishing his own newspaper, entitled The Fool-Killer. The paper was sold nationwide and at its height had over 50,000 subscribers. The paper's masthead showed an explosion blowing up the "drunken fool," "religious fool," "society fool," and "political fool." Larkin wrote that "from the seclusion of these wooded hills will go forth a bundle of literary dynamite that will shake the rotten foundations of society...[The Fool-Killer] is salted with wit, peppered with humor, and seasoned with sarcasm."

Larkin wrote the paper's editorials and included a good deal of his poetry in the paper. He used his paper to promote liberal economic policies and politicians who supported those policies, such as President Franklin D. Roosevelt and his New Deal programs. A teetotaler, Pearson also supported the policy of prohibition in The Fool-Killer.

He stopped publishing the paper in 1935 following the death of his first wife in 1934.

=== Poet ===
In 1924 he printed a book of his poetry which he called Pearson's Poems and stated in the preface, "It was a rather big undertaking for me with my limited facilities and the work is not as perfect as a professional book-maker could have done. But it is fairly presentable anyhow, and I am rather pleased with it. Possibly the fact that I printed it with my own hands will be of some interest to the reader." Pearson's poetry often focused upon farming and other aspects of rural life and country living in the late 19th and early 20th centuries and frequently employed a folksy and informal dialect.

He remarried, this time to Eleanor Fox, in 1939. She died in 1963.

On August 4, 1953, North Carolina Governor William B. Umstead appointed Pearson as North Carolina's second Poet Laureate. He kept this title until his death. His functions as poet laureate included reading poems at the inaugural ceremonies of North Carolina's Governors and promoting interest in poetry at schools, colleges, and universities across the state. Pearson was scheduled to appear on the Johnny Carson Show, but upon learning that Pearson was hard of hearing, the show canceled, stating "we can't have Johnny yelling at an old man on the television."

=== Death and legacy ===
Pearson died on August 27, 1981, of natural causes at the age of 101.

Among the memorials to Pearson is the James Larkin Pearson Award in free-verse poetry; the award is presented annually by the Poetry Council of North Carolina. The library at Wilkes Community College in Wilkesboro, North Carolina is also named in Pearson's honor, and contains many of his personal papers.

== Works ==
- Early Poems. Moravian Falls, NC: Pearson Brothers, 1903.
- Castle Gates: Through Which the Knowing Ones are Admitted into Some of My Castles in Spain. Pearson Printing Co., 1908.
- Pearson's Poems. Boomer, NC: James Larking Pearson, 1924.
- Plowed Ground: Humorous and Dialect Poems. Guilford College, NC: Pearson Printing Co., 1949.
- Early Harvest: The First Experimental Poems of a Self-Taught Farm Boy. Guilford College, NC: Pearson Printing Co., 1952.
- Fifty Acres, and Other Selected Poems. Guilford College, NC: Pearson Printing Co., 1960.
- Selected Poems of James Larkin Pearson, Poet Laureate of North Carolina. Charlotte, NC: McNally, 1960.
- The Country Youth: Autobiography of B.B. McGee. (editor) Guilford College, NC: Pearson Printing Co., 1964.
- My Fingers and My Toes: Complete Poems of James Larkin Pearson. Nashville, TN: Ingram Book Co., 1971.
