= Jaki Shelton Green =

American poet

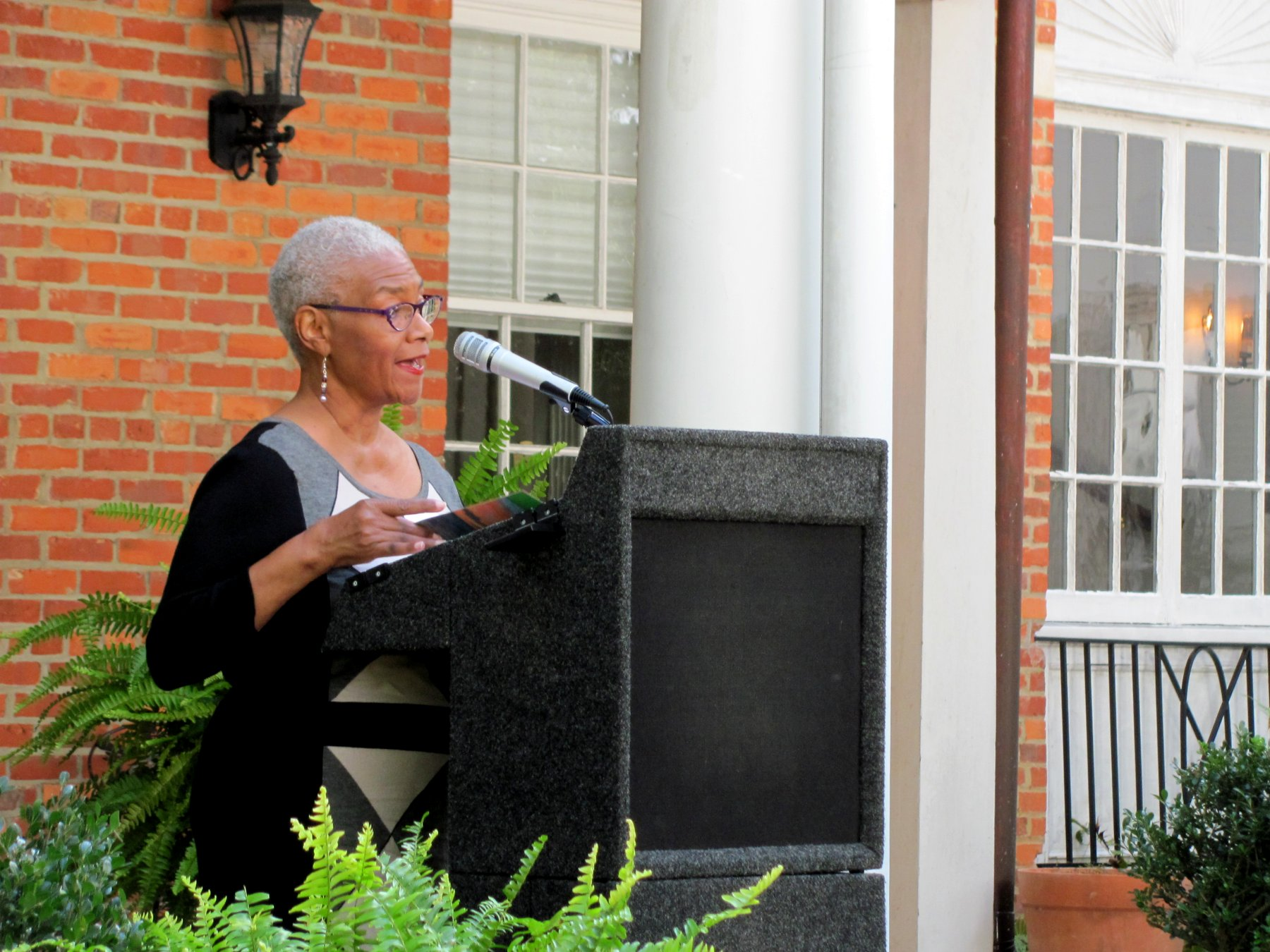
Poet and author Jaki Shelton Green, reading from Maya Angelou's "Still I Rise"

Jaki Shelton Green is an American poet and was appointed North Carolina Poet Laureate in 2018. In November 2009, she was named the first Piedmont Laureate by a collection of Triangle-area arts councils. She currently resides in Mebane, North Carolina. Green teaches Documentary Poetry at Duke University within the Center for Documentary Studies.

Green is a lecturer and workshop facilitator, travelling and teaching at numerous conferences and events. She was appointed North Carolina Poet Laureate in 2018 and re-appointed to the position in 2021.

== Early life ==
Green was born in Alamance County, North Carolina, and grew up in Efland, North Carolina, which is in Orange County. She has said that as a child she was "fidgety" and that her grandmother gave her a writing pad, which she has credited with starting her passion for writing.

Green is a graduate of the George School, which is a private Quaker boarding school in Bucks County, Pennsylvania. She also has a degree in Early Childhood Education from Greater Hartford Community College in Connecticut (now Capital Community College).

== Personal life ==
Green is married and has at least one daughter, Imani, who died of cancer in June 2009.

== SistaWRITE ==
Green is the founder of SistaWRITE. She created the organization in order to "bring women and spaces together for writing, community, sisterhood, and shared experience." SistaWRITE has held writing retreats for women writers in Sedona, Arizona; Martha’s Vineyard; Ocracoke, North Carolina; Northern Morocco; and Tullamore, Ireland.

== Awards ==
Green has been honored at the highest levels in the North Carolina literary world, and in 2019 was recognized nationally by the Academy of American Poets.

=== North Carolina Award for Literature ===
In 2003, the North Carolina Award for Literature was bestowed on Green for "outstanding performance (and achievement) in literature".

=== North Carolina Literary Hall of Fame ===
Green was inducted into the North Carolina Literary Hall of Fame in 2014.

=== North Carolina Poet Laureate ===
Green was recognized and appointed to be the 9th North Carolina Poet Laureate in June 2018 and is North Carolina's first African American to receive this recognition. She was scheduled to be installed in the position on September 19, 2018; however, due to Hurricane Michael, it was rescheduled to December 10, 2018. She was reappointed to the post in 2021.

=== Academy of American Poets Poet Laureate Fellow ===
The Academy of American Poets named Green as one of their first ever Laureate Fellows in 2019.

=== Further Recognition ===
Green has also been recognized with numerous additional awards, including these:

- 2020 Shaw University Ella Baker Women Who Lead Award
- 2020 St. Andrews University Ethel Fortner Arts Award
- 2019 Orange County Bahá’i Light of Unity Award
- 2016 Kathryn H. Wallace Award for Artists in Community Service

== Works ==
Jaki Shelton Green’s work has been published in print, audio-recordings and film. Artists have responded with their own art and collaborations that incorporate Green’s work in sculpture, and the performance arts.

=== Books ===
Green has published eight books of poetry.

- Mask (Carolina Wren Press, 1981)
- Dead on Arrival Chapel Hill, N.C. (Carolina Wren Press, 1983) ISBN 9780932112385
- Swiss Time (Mud Puppy Press, 1990)
- Conjure Blues: Poems (Carolina Wren Press, 1996) ISBN 9780932112378
- singing a tree into the dance (Carolina Wren Press, 2003)
- Breath of the Song: New and Selected Poems (Carolina Wren Press, 2005) ISBN 0932112498
- Feeding the Light (Jacar Press, 2014) ISBN 9780989795234
- I Want to Undie You (Jacar Press, 2017) ISBN 9780936481289

=== Recordings and Film ===
- The River Speaks of Thirst (Released Juneteenth, 2020)

=== Collaborations and Works Inspired by Green ===
Green's poetry has been performed in dance, with choreography by:

- Chuck Davis African Dance Ensemble in conjunction with the Kennedy Center and the Nasher Museum at Duke University;
- Two Near the Edge Dance Company;
- ChoreoCollective;
- Danca Nova Dance Company in partnership with Colorado Naropa Dance Institute; and
- Miami City Ballet.
