= The Land Breakers =

American novel

- Author: John Ehle
- Publisher: HarperCollins
- Publication date: December 1964
- ISBN: 9-780-060-11170-0

The Land Breakers is a 1964 American historical novel by John Ehle. It is the first book in Ehle's seven-volume Appalachian cycle.

== Plot ==
The Land Breakers chronicles the settling of an unnamed, uninhabited, remote Appalachian valley by several pioneering families. The valley is located in mountainous country between Watauga County and the towns of Morganton and Old Fort in western North Carolina. The book’s action takes place from 1779 to 1784 and relates the families’ struggles with harsh weather, wild animals, economic pressures, and interpersonal conflicts.

== Characters ==
- Mooney and Imy Wright are a young Irish immigrant couple who are the first to settle in the valley.
- Tinkler Harrison is an elderly, wealthy plantation owner from Virginia who aspires to dominate the new settlement. He is accompanied by his family and several slaves.
- Lorry Pollard is Tinkler's daughter, who is raising her young sons Lafayette and Verlin alone after being abandoned by her husband Lacey. She and her sons are part of the Harrison party.
- Inez and Ernest Plover are Tinkler Harrison’s sister and brother-in-law, who follow the Harrisons to the valley with their large family, all daughters. The eldest is Pearlamina. Before leaving Virginia, their teenage daughter Belle weds Tinkler Harrison.
- Nicholas and Anna Bentz are a German immigrant couple who settle in the valley with their son Felix.

== Reception ==
Upon its release, the book received positive reviews from critics for its believable relationships among the characters and its authentic portrayal of life in the American frontier. Hal Borland, in a review for The New York Times, praised Ehle's eloquent writing and dialogue, as well as the dramatic narrative underpinning its exploration of life in the "pioneer past." He wrote that the "story moves—even when it seems to pause for sights and sounds and smells that taunt the senses, even when it deals with herbal lore." Kirkus Reviews wrote that it "reads with the authentic regional sound of a folk song recorded by [Alan] Lomax."

=== Reprintings and retrospective reviews ===
The Land Breakers was reissued in 2006 after decades out of print. About the reissue, Harper Lee wrote "John Ehle's meld of historical fact with ineluctable plot-weaving makes The Land Breakers an exciting example of his masterful storytelling. He is our foremost writer of historical fiction." In 2009, Michael Ondaatje wrote of the reissue "The Landbreakers (sic) is a great American novel, way beyond anything most New York literary icons have produced."

The book was reprinted again in November 2014 by New York Review Books. Donna Meredith, in the Southern Literary Review, wrote that the book was a classic and praised its "universal insight into the nature of relationships." B.J. Sedlock reviewed the book for the Historical Novel Society in 2015, noting its use of "simple, spare prose" to convey its central themes of community and survival.

On November 24, 2021, Valerie Stivers published a blog post exploring the historically accurate food of The Land Breakers in The Paris Review.
