= Samuel M. Brinson =

American politician

- Brinson c. 1919–1922

Member of the U.S. House of Representatives from North Carolina's 3rd district
- In office March 4, 1919 – April 13, 1922
- Preceded by: George E. Hood
- Succeeded by: Charles Laban Abernethy

Personal details
- Born: March 20, 1870 New Bern, North Carolina
- Died: April 13, 1922 (aged 52) New Bern, North Carolina
- Party: Democratic

Samuel Mitchell Brinson (March 20, 1870 – April 13, 1922) was an American politician.

Brinson was born in New Bern, Craven County, North Carolina, to William George Brinson and Kittie Elizabeth Brinson. He was the member of the United States House of Representatives for the North Carolina 3rd district from 1919 to 1922. He died in office on April 13, 1922, and is buried at Cedar Grove Cemetery, New Bern, North Carolina. An obituary noted that Mr. Brinson had died of an undisclosed illness "that dated back to the close of the campaign in 1918". During the recess in Congress, Brinson had gone to the Battle Creek Sanitarium in Michigan and, as his condition, went back to New Bern, North Carolina where he was admitted to New Bern General Hospital after his arrival, six days before his death.

== See also ==
- List of members of the United States Congress who died in office (1900–1949)

U.S. House of Representatives
Preceded by George E. Hood	Member of the U.S. House of Representatives from North Carolina's 3rd congressional district 1919–1922	Succeeded by Charles L. Abernethy
