= North Carolina Poet Laureate =

Cultural position

The North Carolina poet laureate is the poet laureate for the U.S. state of North Carolina. At first a life appointment, the term of office is now two years. The program is run by the North Carolina Arts Council. Laureates are appointed by the governor of North Carolina.

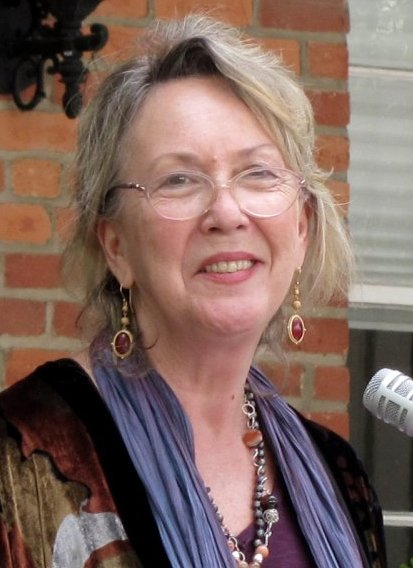
Kathryn Stripling Byer was poet laureate in 2005.

== History ==
Many years before the position was established, poet and journalist John Charles McNeill was unofficially called North Carolina's poet laureate and while official permission from the legislature to name a poet laureate came in 1935, no one was actually appointed to the position until 1948. A joint resolution of the North Carolina General Assembly created the office, giving the Governor of North Carolina the power "to name and appoint some outstanding and distinguished man of letters as poet-laureate for North Carolina."

Changes to the position began in 1997 when Governor Jim Hunt appointed Fred Chappell as poet laureate, changing the term of office from a lifetime appointment to a term of five years. Hunt stated that he did this because the state had many quality poets. Lisbeth Evans, Secretary of the Department of Cultural Resources (which oversees the NC Arts Council), organized a committee in 2004 to update the guidelines of the resolution. These guidelines, which detailed the office's appointment requirements and made them gender-neutral, would be non-binding.

== Responsibilities ==
The office-holder becomes an "ambassador of N.C. literature" and is free to create his or her own long-term projects. The position requires the laureate to participate in various literary activities across the state, working with "schools, community groups, and the press." The North Carolina Poetry Society also has the poet laureate select the winner of the Poet Laureate Award.

The poet laureate receives a stipend of $10,000 and clerical assistance from the NC Arts Council.

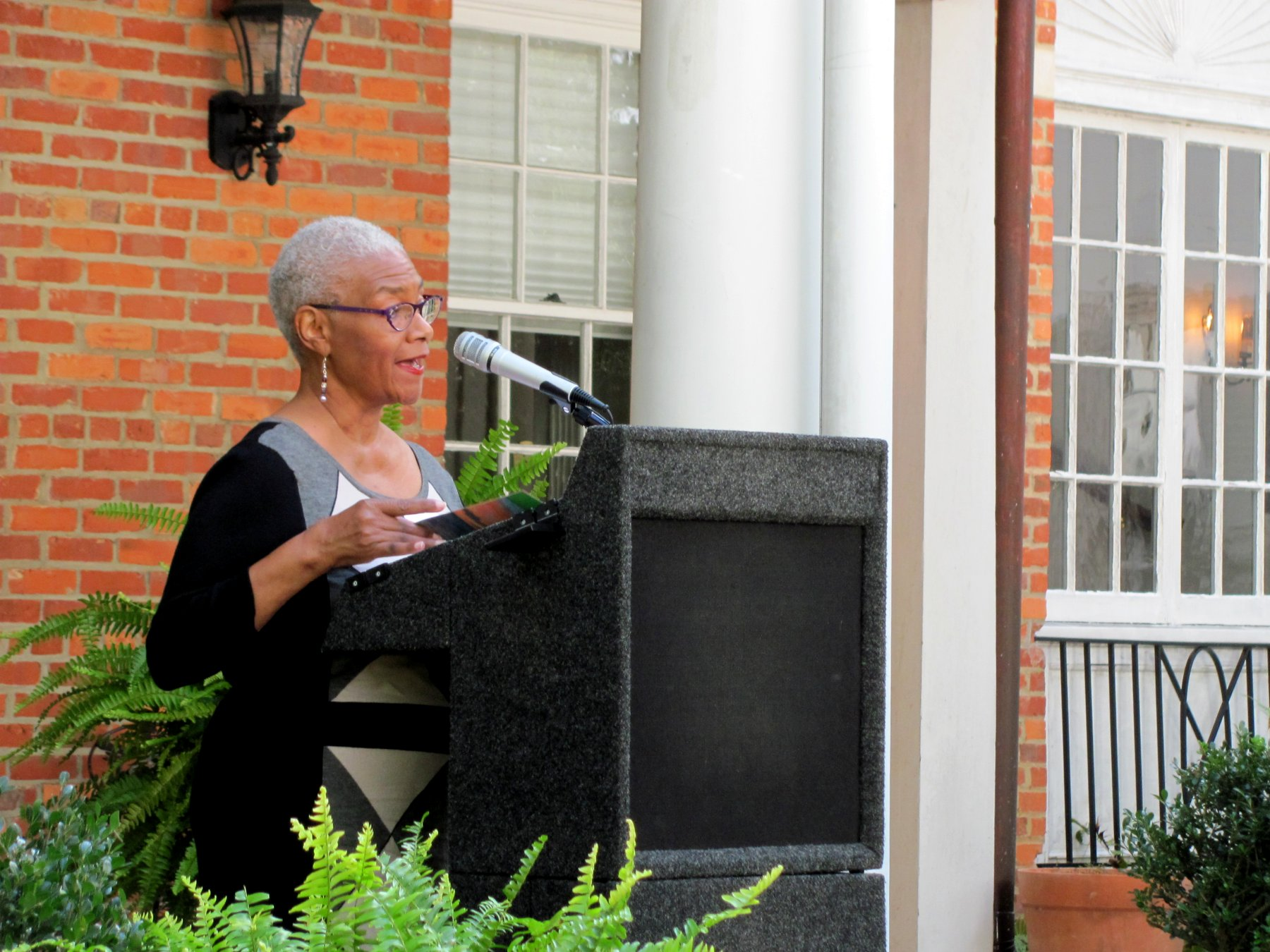
Jaki Shelton Green is the current poet laureate since 2018.

== List of poets laureate ==
The following is a list of North Carolina poets laureate.

- Arthur Talmage Abernethy (1948–1953; appointed by Gregg Cherry)
- James Larkin Pearson (1953–1981; appointed by William B. Umstead)
- Sam Ragan (1982–1996; appointed by Jim Hunt)
- Fred Chappell (1997–2002; appointed by Jim Hunt)
- Kathryn Stripling Byer (2005–2009; appointed by Mike Easley)
- Cathy Smith Bowers (2010–2012; appointed by Bev Perdue)
- Joseph Bathanti (2012–2014; appointed by Bev Perdue)
- Valerie Macon (July 11–17, 2014; appointed by Pat McCrory); resigned
- Shelby Stephenson (December 22, 2014 – June 30, 2018; appointed by Pat McCrory)
- Jaki Shelton Green (July 1, 2018 – current; appointed by Roy Cooper)

== See also ==
- North Carolina literature
- List of U.S. state poets laureate
