= Kay Byer =

American poet (1944–2017)

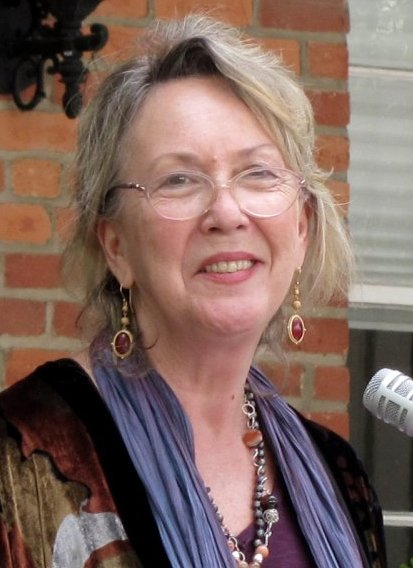
- Byer accepting an award from the North Carolina Literary Hall of Fame in 2012
- Born: Kathryn Stripling; November 25, 1944; Camilla, Georgia, U.S.
- Died: June 5, 2017 (aged 72); Cullowhee, North Carolina, U.S.
- Education: Wesleyan College, B.A. UNC-Greensboro, M.F.A.
- Occupation: Poet
- Spouse: Jim Byer
- Children: 1
- Writing career
- Genres: Poetry, essays
- Notable awards: North Carolina Poet Laureate

Kathryn Stripling Byer (November 25, 1944 – June 5, 2017), also called Kay Byer, was an American poet and teacher. She was named by Governor Mike Easley as the fifth North Carolina Poet Laureate from 2005 to 2009. She was the first woman to hold the position.

== Biography ==
=== Early life and education ===
Kathryn Stripling was born in Camilla, Georgia in 1944. Her parents were C.M. Stripling, a farmer, and his wife, Bernice (née Campbell) Stripling.

She went on to graduate with a bachelors in English from Macon, Georgia's Wesleyan College and then received her M.F.A. from the University of North Carolina at Greensboro, where she studied under Allen Tate, Fred Chappell, and Robert W. Watson. During this time at UNC-G, Byer decided to move to the mountains of North Carolina.

=== Career ===
After receiving her M.F.A., Byer became poet-in-residence at Western Carolina University, 1988–98, as well as UNC-G in 1995 and Lenoir-Rhyne College in 1999. She has published six full collections of poetry as well as some chapbooks. Descent was published in 2012 by Louisiana State University Press. In 2015 The Vishnu Bird was published by Jacar Press.

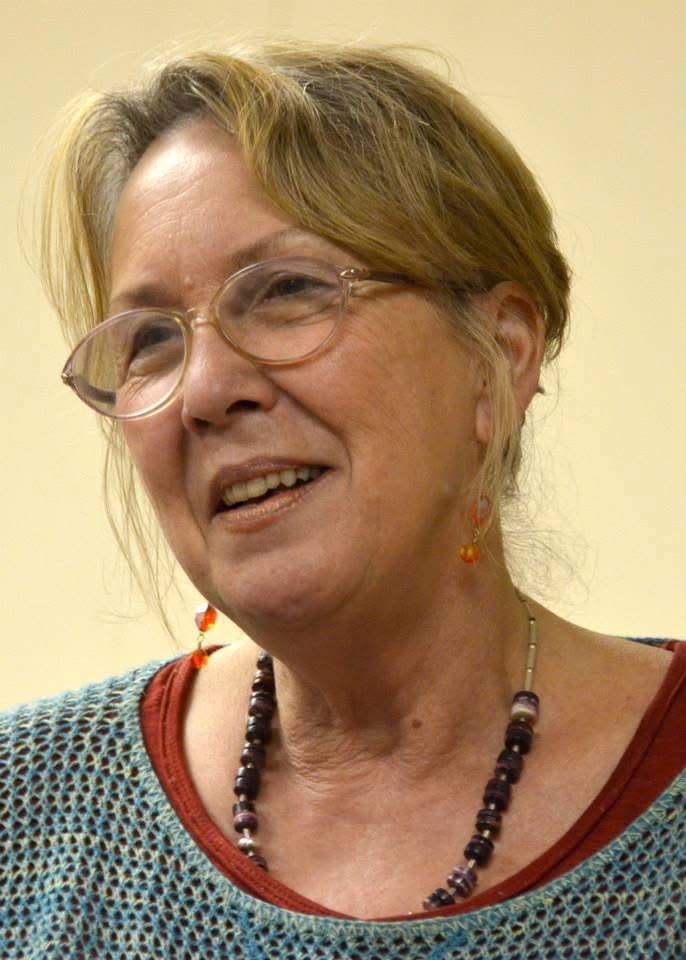
Kay Byer, 2013

=== Poet laureateship ===
In 2005, North Carolina Governor Michael Easley appointed Byer to be the state's fifth poet laureate following Fred Chappell whose term ended in 2002. She was the first woman to hold the position.

As part of her outreach program during her term as poet laureate, Byer maintained "My Laureate's Lasso", a blog that focused on North Carolina poets and poetry. She was also the judge for the North Carolina Poetry Society's Poet Laureate Award. In 2008, Byer named Katherine Indermaur as the first North Carolina Student Poet Laureate.

== Personal life ==
Kathryn Stripling married Western Carolina University professor Jim Byer. They had one daughter and last lived in Cullowhee, North Carolina.

== Death ==
Kathryn Stripling Byer died at the age of 72 in Cullowhee on June 5, 2017, from lymphoma.

== Works ==
Some of Byer's poetry appeared in, among other periodicals, The Carolina Quarterly, The Georgia Review, The Hudson Review, The Iowa Review, Poetry, and The Southern Review. Her work often dealt with lives and hardships of western North Carolina mountain inhabitants, especially women, in earlier generations.

=== Books ===
Byer's books include:

- The Girl in the Midst of the Harvest (1986), Associated Writing Programs award series
- Wildwood Flower (1992)
- Black Shawl (1998)
- Catching Light (Louisiana State University Press, 2002)
- Wake (chapbook, 2003)
- Coming to Rest (Louisiana State University Press, 2006)
- The Movable Nest: A Mother/Daughter Companion as co-editor with Kallet, Marilyn (Helicon Nine Editions, 2007)
- Southern Fictions (sonnet chapbook; Jacar Press, 2011)
- Descent (Louisiana State University Press, 2012)
- The Vishnu Bird (Jacar Press, 2015)
- Trawling the Silence (Jacar Press, 2019)

=== Essays ===
Some of Byer's most notable essays include:

- "Turning the Windlass at the Well: Fred Chappell's Early Poetry" in Dream Garden: The Poetic Vision of Fred Chappell (1997)
- "Deep Water" in Bloodroot: Reflections on Place by Appalachian Women Writers (1998)

== Awards and honors ==
- 1992 – Lamont Poetry Selection of the Academy of American Poets
- 1998 – Roanoke-Chowan Award for Poetry
- 2001 – Emory and Henry College's Kathryn Stripling Byer Literary Festival
- 2001 – North Carolina Award in Literature
- 2003 – SIBA Book Award in Poetry for Catching Light
- 2005 – North Carolina Poet Laureate through 2009
- 2007 - Hanes Poetry Award for "Coming to Rest" presented by the Fellowship of Southern Writers
- 2007 – Wesleyan College bestowed an honorary doctorate of literature upon her
- 2012 – Inducted into the North Carolina Literary Hall of Fame
- 2013 – SIBA Book Award in Poetry for Descent
