= List of websites founded before 1995 =

The first website was created in August 1991 by Tim Berners-Lee at CERN, a European nuclear research agency. Berners-Lee's WorldWideWeb browser became publicly available the same month. By June 1992, there were ten websites. The World Wide Web began to enter everyday use in 1993, helping to grow the number of websites to 623 by the end of the year. In 1994, websites for the general public became available. By the end of 1994, the total number of websites was 2,278, including several notable websites and many precursors of today's most popular services.

By June 1995, the number of websites had expanded significantly, with some 23,500 sites. Thus, this list of websites founded before 1995 covers the early innovators. Of the 2,879 websites established before 1995, those listed here meet one or more of the following:

- They still exist (albeit in some cases with different names).
- They made a significant contribution to the history of the World Wide Web.
- They helped to shape modern Web content, such as webcomics and weblogs.

For this list, the term website is interpreted as a unique hostname that can be resolved into an IP address.

== 1991 websites ==
The following list of websites established in 1991 is in chronological order.

=== CERN ===
CERN, a research center in Switzerland, created the first website. The Web was publicly announced with a post to the Usenet newsgroup alt.hypertext on August 6, 1991. There is a snapshot of the site from November 1992 at The World Wide Web project.

=== World Wide Web Virtual Library ===
The World Wide Web Virtual Library is a website started as Tim Berners-Lee's web catalog at CERN. There is a snapshot of the site from November 1992 at Subject listing – Information by Subject.

=== Stanford Linear Accelerator Center ===
Paul Kunz, of the Stanford Linear Accelerator Center (SLAC) at Stanford University, visited Tim Berners-Lee at CERN in September 1991. He was impressed by the WWW project and brought a copy of the software back to Stanford. SLAC launched the first web server in North America on December 12, 1991. SLAC's first web page was the SLACVM Information Service.

== 1992 websites ==
Near the end of 1992, there were fifty to sixty websites, according to a robot web crawl by Centrum Wiskunde & Informatica researcher Guido van Rossum. The following list is in chronological order.

=== Nikhef ===
Nikhef, the Dutch National Institute for Subatomic Physics, launched the third website in the world in February 1992. It was originally at nic.nikhef.nl.

=== National Center for Supercomputing Applications ===
The National Center for Supercomputing Applications created a website that was home to the NCSA Mosaic web browser, as well as documentation on the web and a "What's New?" list which many people used as an early web directory.

=== FNAL ===
Fermilab, a high-energy physics laboratory in Illinois, created fnal.gov, the second or third website in the United States. It was established in June 1992.

=== SunSITE ===
SunSITE (Sun Software, Information & Technology Exchange) started in 1992 as an FTP service and was hosted by the University of North Carolina at Chapel Hill. It was a comprehensive archiving project that was a collaboration between Sun Microsystems Computer Corporation and the Office of Information Technology at the University of North Carolina.

=== Wright State University Libraries ===
The Wright State University University Library's first web presence, LIBNET, was launched in 1992. This is just one year after the first website was introduced to the public. The interface provided access to the library catalog, other library catalog, internet resources and subject guides, government resources, course reserve and more. It was a very early example of an academic library website.

=== Ohio State University ===
The Ohio State University Department of Computer and Information Science developed early gateway programs and undertook the mass conversion of existing documents, including the main page for RFCs, TeXinfo, UNIX, and the Usenet.

=== IN2P3 ===
The French National Institute for Nuclear Physics and Particle Physics (IN2P3) launched its website at Centre de Calcul in 1992.

=== CURIA ===
Peter Flynn from University College Cork (UCC) saw Tim Berners-Lee demonstrating the Web at a RARE WG3 meeting. He installed Berners-Lee's client and server software on a Sun workstation for the CURIA project at UCC, now known as Corpus of Electronic Texts. The web server in was running in April 1992, becoming the ninth web server in the world and the first in Ireland.

=== HUJI ===
The Hebrew University of Jerusalem (HUJI) Information Service launched its website in Hebrew and English in April 1992. It was the first RTL website and the tenth website to go online.

=== The Exploratorium ===
The Exploratorium in San Francisco, California, was one of the first science museums to go online.

=== simianpress ===
simianpress was a manifestation of youngmonkey. It was a showcase for graphic design and publishing projects, likely offering the first professional website design. It merged with youngmonkey in 1995.

=== CBSS ===
CBSS, Inc. was a network consulting firm in Houston, Texas that came online in late 1992. The Website is no longer maintained but still visible at www.cbss.com.

=== KEK ===
KEK: The High Energy Accelerator Research Organization established the first web page in Japan. It was created by Yohei Morita at the suggestion of Tim Berners-Lee in September 1992. CERN's website was linked to the KEK page on September 30, 1992. It is still online at KEK Entry Point.

=== Cybergrass ===
Bob Cherr launched the Bluegrass Music News and Information, the first music-based website, on September 9, 1992. Its name changed to Banjo on September 30, 1992, and Cybergrass in 1995. Its content was bluegrass music, lyrics, and chords. It was hosted on the Xerox Palo Alto Research Center vax, parcvax.xerox.com. It now resides at www.cybergrass.com.

== 1993 websites ==
By the end of 1993, there were 623 websites, according to a study by Massachusetts Institute of Technology researcher Matthew Gray. The following list of websites established in 1993 is in alphabetical order.

=== Bloomberg.com ===
Bloomberg.com is a financial portal with information on markets, currency conversion, news and events, and Bloomberg Terminal subscriptions.

=== Chabad.org ===
Chabad.org is the flagship website of the Chabad Hasidic Judaism movement. It was launched in fall of 1993.

=== Doctor Fun ===
Doctor Fun was one of the first webcomics. The National Center for Supercomputing Applications called it "a major breakthrough for the Web". It laid the foundation for today's webcomics.

=== Électricité de France ===
Électricité de France, the French utility company, had one of the first industrial websites in Europe. It started as the website of the company's research and development division (R&D) and was implemented by engineers Sylvain Langlois, Emmanuel Poiret, and Daniel Glazman. They did not have approval for the site and had to restart the server by connecting to RENATER through a 155Mb link, every time IT shut it down. Electricité de France's R&D later submitted patches to CERN httpd and was active in Web standardization.

=== Global Network Navigator ===
Created by O'Reilly Media, Global Network Navigator is an example of an early web directory and is one of the Web's first commercial sites. It was hosted at Bolt Beranek and Newman and was launched in October 1993.

=== Haystack Observatory ===
Haystack Observatory's website explained its radio and radar remote sensing mission and provided data access for science users. John Holt rolled out its content on December 13, 1993. The website is still active at www.haystack.mit.edu. The original web page format is archived at www.haystack.mit.edu/orig/.

=== IMDb ===
The Internet Movie Database (IMDb) was founded in 1990 by participants in the Usenet newsgroup rec.arts.movies. IMDb was launched on the web in late 1993 and was initially hosted by the computer science department of Cardiff University in Wales.

=== Internet Underground Music Archive ===
Internet Underground Music Archive (IUMA) was created by students at the University of California, Santa Cruz to help promote unsigned musical artists. It shared music using the MP2 format, presaging the later extreme popularity of MP3 sharing and online music stores.

=== IONA Technologies ===
The IONA Technologies website, www.iona.ie, was created by their System administrator, Justin Mason in June 1993, becoming the first website in Ireland that was run by a commercial company. Initially, the site just included pages for his own use, but with Colin Newman they put together web pages for the company and its object request broker.

=== Joachim Jarre Society ===
The Joachim Jarre Society website was created by students at the Norwegian University of Science and Technology in November 1993. It was one of the first websites in Norway.

=== JumpStation ===
JumpStation was the world's first Web search engine. It was launched by Jonathon Fletcher on December 12, 1993. It was hosted at the University of Stirling in Scotland and operated until 1994.

=== LANL preprint archive ===
The LANL preprint archive provided web access to thousands of papers in physics, mathematics, computer science, and biology. It was developed by Paul Ginsparg out of earlier Gopher, File Transfer Protocol (FTP), and e-mail archives at the Los Alamos National Laboratory It was launched in April 1993 and moved to Cornell University as ArXiv when Ginsparg took a position there in 2001. It is still active as arxiv.org.

=== LSD.com ===
LSD.com, the "digital acid test" came online on November 18, 1993.

=== The OTIS Project ===
After a start as an anonymous FTP-based art gallery and collaborative collective, The OTIS Project (later SITO) moved to the web in January 1993. This artist collaborative was hosted by SunSITE. It remains at sito.org/.

=== The Tech ===
The Tech, the campus newspaper at the Massachusetts Institute of Technology, was the first newspaper to deliver content over the Web, beginning in May 1993.

=== NASA ===
NASA.gov is the website of the National Aeronautics and Space Administration. It was launched in 1993.

=== Nexor ===
Martijn Koster created a website for Nexor, an early Internet software company.

=== MTV ===
MTV VJ Adam Curry registered the music television network's domain in 1993 and personally ran an unofficial site. Later, MTV sued Curry over the rights to the domain. The corporate website is still live at www.mtv.com/.

=== Nippon Telegraph and Telephone ===
Nippon Telegraph and Telephone or NTT (WWW Servers in Japan (日本のホームページ, Nihon no houmu peiji; lit. "Home Pages in Japan") was the most famous web page in Japan in the mid-1990s. The page launched in December 1993. It still has a website at group.ntt/en.

=== PARC Map Server ===
PARC Map Server is the earliest precursor of MapQuest and Google Maps.

=== PARC Researcher ===
PARC Researcher was created by PARC researcher, Steve Putz, who tied an existing map viewing program to the Web. It is now defunct.

=== photo.net ===
Philip Greenspun designed and founded photo.net, an online photography resource and community. Later, Greenspun released the software behind photo.net, the ArsDigita Community System, as a free open-source toolkit for building community websites.

=== Principia Cybernetica ===
Francis Heylighen, Cliff Joslyn, and Valentin Turchin designed a website for Principia Cybernetica to develop a cybernetic philosophy. This is probably the first complex, collaborative knowledge system, sporting a hierarchical structure, index, map, annotations, search, and hyperlinks. It went online in July 1993.

=== School of Mathematics, Trinity College Dublin ===
Students James Casey and Matt Davey in the School of Mathematics, Trinity College Dublin, established www.maths.tcd.ie using Tony Sanders's Plexus, at the suggestion of Justin Mason in the summer of 1993. The website initially contained departmental information, an electronic version of the Constitution of Ireland, a hypertext interface to the department MOO and information on some student societies.

=== ExPASy ===
ExPASy was a project of the Swiss Institute of Bioinformatics and was the first life sciences website. it went online in August 1993 and is still active at www.expasy.org.

=== Trojan Room coffee pot ===
Trojan Room coffee pot was the first webcam. It started as a local system, XCoffee, in 1991 and was connected to the Web in November 1993.

=== Trincoll Journal ===
Trincoll Journal was a multimedia webzine published by students at Trinity College in Hartford, Connecticut. It was established in 1992 as a local network and moved to the web in November 1993. It went defunct in the spring of 2000.

=== Wired.com ===
Previously called Wired News and HotWired, the online presence for Wired magazine launched in October 1994. The website and magazine separated and Wired.com was purchased by Lycos. It is still live at www.wired.com/.

== 1994 websites ==
By mid-1994, there were 2,738 websites, according to a study by Massachusetts Institute of Technology researcher Matthew Gray. By the end of 1994, there were more than 10,000 websites. The following selected list of websites is in alphabetical order.

=== ALIWEB ===
ALIWEB (Archie Like Indexing for the WEB) was the first search engine created for the Web. It was announced in November 1993 by Martijn Koster and went online in May 1994, but was short-lived.

=== Allied Artists Entertainment Group ===
The movie studio and film distribution company Allied Artists Entertainment Group (now Allied Artists International), registered URLs in 1993 and launched its website in 1994.

=== American Marketing Association ===
A group of marketing professors created a website for the American Marketing Association professional association in 1994. The website offered general marketing news for marketers and marketing professors. Approximately a year later, the site was moved to www.ama.org, where it remains.

=== Amnesty International Canada ===
The International Secretariat and the Computer Communications Working Group of Amnesty International Canada created a human rights website in 1994. It still operates at amnesty.ca.

=== Apple Inc. ===
Apple Inc. created apple.com, an example of an early corporate site, using the NCSA Mosaic browser. Snapshots of early versions of this site are available through the Version Museum.

=== Art.Net ===
Lile Elam created Art.Net or Art on the Net in June 1994 to showcase the artwork of San Francisco Bay Area artists as well as international artists. It offers free linkage and hosts extensive links to other artists' sites. (This is not to be confused with Artnet, a publicly traded art market website based in New York City.)

=== Art Crimes ===
Susan Farrell of the Art Crimes Gallery launched the website Art Crimes in September 1994. It was the first graffiti art website and originally served as an archive of photos from around the world. It became an important academic resource as well as a thriving online community. Its early content was moved to the Graffiti Archives in August 2015.

=== The Amazing FishCam ===
Lou Montulli created The Amazing FishCam which provided a continuous web feed of an aquarium in the Netscape headquarters, via a webcam. This was the second live camera broadcast on the Web. According to a contemporaneous article by The Economist, "In its audacious uselessness—and that of thousands of ego trips like it—lie the seeds of the Internet revolution." It went offline in the summer of 2007, showing an empty tank on the website. It was later moved to a new site showing Montulli's new tank at the offices of Zetta, but has since ceased operations.

=== Automatic Complaint-Letter Generator ===
Scott Pakin created the Automatic Complaint-Letter Generator in April 1994. The site allows users to specify the name of the individual or company that the complaint is directed toward, as well as the number of paragraphs the complaint will have. After submitting the data, the computer generates sentences that are composed of arbitrary verbs, nouns, and adjectives. This website is still active at www.pakin.org/complaint.

=== The Barney Fun Page ===
An early online game or meme, The Barney Fun Page allows users to attack a crude drawing of Barney the Dinosaur with icons representing a knife, gun, and other weapons. Hosted originally on a University of Alberta computer system in October 1994, it moved to impressive.net in 1996, where it is still available. It is an example of anti-Barney humor.

=== BBC Online ===
BBC Online started as BBCi in April 1994 with some regional information and content from the Open University Production Centre (OUPC). By September, it launched the first commercial service, providing transcription services via an FTP server. At its peak, it had 122 accounts, including FBI offices from around the world, taking daily updates from twelve feeds. It is still active at bbc.com.

=== Bianca's Smut Shack ===
Bianca's Smut Shack was an early web-based chatroom and online community known for raucous free speech and deviant behavior.

=== Birmingham City Council ===
Birmingham City Council (England) created an early local government site, Birmingham Assist, that was initially hosted by the Computer Science Department at the University of Birmingham. It was renamed in 1996 and still functions at www.birmingham.gov.uk/.

=== Britannica Online ===
Encyclopaedia Britannica launched Britannica Online as a subscription service in 1994. It was the first Internet-based encyclopedia. The encyclopedia has been published exclusively online at www.britannica.com since 2016.

=== Buzzweb.com ===
Buzzweb.com was a website for alternative music artists and news. It was created by A. Joi Brown and Matthew Brown between 1993 and 1994. They registered the website with Network Solutions in 1993.

=== CDNAir.ca ===
Canadian Airlines' website, CDNAir.ca, was the first website for an airline.

=== Chabad.org ===
Chabad.org was the first "ask the rabbi" website. It was launched by Rabbi Yosef Yitzchak Kazen as an outgrowth of earlier discussion groups on FidoNet, which dated back to 1988.

=== CitySites ===
CitySites, the first "City Site" web development company, created this website in 1994 to advertise businesses and review music and art events in the San Francisco Bay Area. CitySites was featured in Interactive Week Magazine in 1997. Founder Darrow Boggiano still operates CitySites.

=== Classical MIDI Archives ===
Pierre R. Schwob founded Classical MIDI Archives in 1994 as an online digital music archive featuring MIDI sequences of classical music for free. It became Classical Archives in August 2000 and now offers commercial label recordings for downloading and streaming. It is still active at www.classicalarchives.com/.

=== Cool Site of the Day ===
Webdesigner Glenn Davis created Cool Site of the Day in August 1994, featuring his daily pick of a website. Its Cool Site of the Year Award, also known as the Webby Awards, became a coveted prize for Silicon Alley start-ups. Davis disaffiliated with the site in November 1995 and it was removed in February 2020.

=== Cybersell ===
Cybersell was the first commercial advertising service that focused on using spam. It came online as sell.com. It was set up by Laurence Canter and Martha Siegel, notorious for spamming Usenet newsgroups earlier that year. It is no longer active.

=== CORDIS ===
CORDIS, an anacronym for the Community Research & Development Information Service, was the European Commission's first permanent website. Launched on ESPRIT day in November 1994 as www.cordis.lu, it provided a repository of EU-funded research projects. It is still online at cordis.europa.eu/.

=== Dianne Feinstein ===
Dianne Feinstein used a website for her United States Senate campaign, becoming the first senatorial candidate to have utilized a website.

=== The Economist ===
The Economist created its website in early 1994. One of the magazine's correspondents, Kenneth Cukier, paid $120 ($261 adjusted for inflation) to create the website which featured a web portal with search tools such as Archie, Gopher, Jughead, Veronica, and WAIS. At the end of 1993, America Online selected it as one of the top-ten news sites in the world; beating Time-Warner's Pathfinder which cost $120 million ($260,664,571 adjusted for inflation). It is still live today at www.economist.com/.

=== e-democracy ===
e-democracy went online in 1994 to help civic organizations in Minnesota. It would distribute information online and then hold the first online debates ever for US Gubernatorial and Senatorial candidates in October 1994.

=== Einet Galaxy ===
Einet Galaxy was one of the first searchable web catalogs. It was created at the Einet Division of the MCC Research Consortium at the University of Texas at Austin and went online in January 1994. It passed through several commercial owners and is now run by Logika Corporation as gallexy.einet.

=== FogCam! ===
Jeff Schwartz and Dan Wong launched FogCam! in July 1994 at San Francisco State University to track changes in the local weather. It is the oldest still-operating webcam in the world and can be found at www.fogcam.org

=== FolkBook ===
FolkBook: An Online Acoustic Music Establishment was a fansite dedicated to documenting folk music and folk musicians. It operated at Ohio State University at web.cgrg.ohio-state.edu/folkbook/ from September 1, 1994, until it went offline on March 7, 1998. After that, it was redirected to a similar site, folkmusic.org/, which still exists, but has not been updated since 2002.

=== Flags of the World ===
Flags of the World is the Internet's largest website devoted to vexillology. It was established by Giuseppe Bottasini in 1994 and is still live as www.crwflags.com.

=== GeneNetwork ===
GeneNetwork launched in January 1994 and was the first website on biomedical research and the earliest Uniform Resource Locator (URL) in PubMed. It was initially known as the Portable Dictionary of the Mouse Genome and then as WebQTL. This genetics site has been funded continuously by the National Institutes of Health and the University of Tennessee-Oak Ridge National Laboratory Governor's Chair to RW Williams.

=== HM Treasury ===
HM Treasury, the United Kingdom government department, formed a website in 1994. It is live at www.gov.uk/government/organisations/hm-treasury.

=== Horror ===
Horror is the earliest website dedicated to horror movies and horror book/comic reviews and news. It is still live at www.horror.com/.

=== HotWired ===
HotWired is the website of Wired magazine. It is noteworthy as the home of the first banner ads, for Zima and AT&T.

=== IBM ===
IBM launched one of the early corporate websites in 1994. It is live at www.ibm.com/us-en.

=== Innerviews ===
Innerviews was the first online music magazine. It was launched by music journalist Anil Prasad and is accessible at Innerviews: Music Without Borders

=== The Irish Times ===
In 1994, The Irish Times became the first newspaper in Ireland to have a website, at IEunet.ie. The newspaper moved to irish-times.com in 1995, ireland.com in 1999 and irishtimes.com in 2008.

=== Lawinfo ===
Lawinfo is an early legal website and provides public access to pre-qualified, pre-screened attorneys, and free legal resources. It is still live at www.lawinfo.com/.

=== Legislative Information System ===
Virginia's Legislative Information System (LIS) was developed by the Division of Legislative Automated Systems (dlas) and was launched at leg1.state.va.us. It remains active as lis.virginia.gov but is also viewable in its original format at LIS Classic.

=== Links from the Underground ===
Justin Hall's Links from the Underground is one of the earliest examples of personal weblogging. It is still available at www.links.net/vita/web/start/.

=== Literary Kicks ===
Literary Kicks was an early literary website about the Beat Generation, spoken word poetry, and alternative literary scenes. This digital library was launched by Levi Asher on July 23, 1994, and is still active at litkicks.com/.

=== Lycos ===
Lycos was an early web search engine. It was started in 1994 by Michael Mauldin as a university research project at Carnegie Mellon University. It is still live at www.lycos.com/.

=== Megadeth, Arizona ===
Megadeth, Arizona was the website for the band Megadeth and was also the first website for a band. It was created by Robin Sloan Bechtel of Capitol Records as a tie-in to a record promotion and featured news updates and a chatroom. Later, when Capitol wanted to remove the website, Bechtel fought conventional wisdom that promotions were short-lived and helped establish the concept on ongoing marketing sites.

=== Microsoft ===
An early corporate site for Microsoft was launched in 1994.

=== Museum of Bad Art ===
Museum of Bad Art in Boston, Massachusetts created a virtual museum in 1994.

=== The Nine Planets ===
Bill Arnett created The Nine Planets, "a Multimedia Tour of the Solar System". It was one of the first examples of a multimedia website. It is still live at nineplanets.org/.

=== Nando.net ===
Nando.net was the online presence of the Raleigh, North Carolina News & Observer and was one of the first newspaper websites.

=== NetBoy ===
NetBoy is a popular early webcomic created by Stafford Huyler. It started publishing in May 1994. It is available online at www.netboy.com/.

=== Netrek ===
Netrek is one of the first sites dedicated to multi-user video-game programming on the Internet. It was maintained at obsidian.math.Arizona.edu and is now defunct.

=== Pathfinder.com ===
Pathfinder.com was one of the first web portals, created by Time Warner to link its various sites. It operated from 1994 to April 1999.

=== Phish.net ===
Phish.net is a fan site for the American jam band Phish, which originated as a mailing list in June 1991. Resources and discussions were initially hosted on a Brown University server before they were transferred to a dedicated machine in June 1994, after which the Phish.net website was launched.

=== PizzaNet ===
Pizza Hut started the website, PizzaNet, which allowed people in Santa Cruz, California to order pizza over the Web.

=== Powells.com ===
Powells.com is the website of Powell's Books. It started with two employees, and the company's first online order was placed by an Apple employee. It pre-dates Amazon.com.

=== PrimePages ===
PrimePages is a website about prime numbers originally created by Chris Caldwell at the University of Tennessee at Martin. The site maintains a fairly comprehensive database of prime numbers. Caldwell hosted it from 1994 to 2023, at which point it was migrated to t5k.org to be managed by Reginald McLean and Rytis Slatkevičius.

=== Purple.com ===
Launching on August 31, 1994, Purple.com is the first known single-serving site. It consisted of just a purple background. It was defunct by November 2017.

=== Radio Prague ===
Radio Prague is the official international broadcasting station of the Czech Republic. It was an early media entity on the web and included transcripts of its news broadcasts and other current affairs content in five languages. Still active at english.radio.cz/.

=== Ren and Stimpy Information ===
A fan site for the cartoon The Ren & Stimpy Show, which was launched in 1994 and was one of the first websites about an animated series.

=== Senator Edward Kennedy ===
The first website for a United States Senator was officially announced for Senator Edward Kennedy on June 2, 1994. The site remains active.

=== Saccharomyces Genome Database ===
Saccharomyces Genome Database is a National Institute of Health-funded research project on the Web. It provides curation of all published results on budding yeast (aka. bakers, brewers, and wine yeast) genes and their products. Its current URL is yeastgenome.org.

=== Sex.com ===
The website Sex.com was the subject of a twelve-year legal battle that established parameters of domain ownership.

=== The Skeptic's Dictionary ===
The Skeptic's Dictionary at /www.skepdic.com/ was launched in 1994 and is still active. It features definitions, arguments, and essays on topics ranging from acupuncture to zombies.

=== The Simpsons Archive ===
The Simpsons Archive was the first fan site for The Simpsons television show. It started as snpp.com (“snpp” was short for Springfield Nuclear Power Plant) and is now live at www.simpsonsarchive.com/.

=== Sirius Connections ===
Sirius Connections was the first Internet service provider in the San Francisco Bay Area. Its owner, Arman Kahalili, gave novice website creators technical assistance to get them started on-site building and expanding code that was used in later versions of HTML and other web technology.

=== Snopes ===
Snopes, the fact-checking website, was created by David and Barbara Mikkelson in 1994. It was an early online encyclopedia focused on urban legends and rumors.

=== SpinnWebe ===
SpinnWebe was an early humor site, called "a window on the weird" by The New Yorker. It started as the personal website of Greg Galcik.

=== Telegraph.co.uk ===
Telegraph.co.uk or The Electronic Telegraph is the website of the British newspaper, The Daily Telegraph. It launched in November 1994.

=== United States Department of State ===
The United States Department of State's Bureau of Public Affairs launched a text Gopher website via the Federal Depository Library at the University of Illinois Chicago in the fall of 1994. The website was later relaunched in January 1995.

=== VeloNews ===
New South Network Service developed the first sports news site for cycling magazine VeloNews. It was originally called VeloNews Tour de France and was created to cover the Tour de France from June 30 to July 30, 1994.

=== VirtuMall ===
Dan Housman and Ron Schmelzer created VirtuMall in 1994. when they were fraternity brothers and roommates at the Massachusetts Institute of Technology. This website pioneered shopping cart technology and credit card payments sent via fax to mail order catalogs. It was also the first pooled-traffic site, helping foster standards for security. One of the first virtual "tenants" was Hickory Farms. The website's name changed to ChannelWave and was sold to Quick Commerce sometime after 1998.

=== WWW Useless Pages ===
Paul Phillips founded WWW Useless Pages or The Unless Pages in 1994. It is perhaps the first site that showcased bad or eccentric websites and helped distribute early minor Internet memes and phenomena. It is now defunct.

=== WebCrawler ===
WebCrawler is an early search engine for the Web and the first with full-text searching. It was created by Brian Pinkerton, a doctoral candidate at the University of Washington. It launched in June 1994.

=== Webmedia ===
Webmedia is a London-based website design company founded by Steve Bowbrick and Ivan Pope. The domain name webmedia.com was registered on October 27, 1994. The website was launched in November 1994.

=== Whitehouse.gov ===
Whitehouse.gov is the official website of the White House. The Clinton administration launched it on October 20, 1994 to the public.

=== World-Wide Web Worm ===
The World-Wide Web Worm (WWWW) was one of the first search engines for the World-Wide Web. It was created by Oliver McBryan at the University of Colorado and was announced in March 1994.

=== Yahoo! ===
The web portal Yahoo! was started by Jerry Yang and David Filo as Jerry's Guide to the World Wide Web. It was a news site as well as a search engine and email provider. It was later renamed Yahoo without the exclamation mark.

=== Zapatista National Liberation Army (EZLN) ===
EZLN provided information on the conflict in the Chiapas region between the Mexican government and the Zapatista forces primarily in English but later started posting information in Spanish at www.ezln.org. The Zapatistas usage of the internet made them among the first in the world to use the internet for activism purposes.

== See also ==
- History of the World Wide Web
- Internet Archive
- Wayback Machine
