= FogCam =

Longest-running webcam

The website in January 2025

FogCam (Note: also stylized as Fogcam or FogCam!; the official website features a header reading The San Francisco FogCam!.) is the longest-running webcam in the world, barring maintenance breaks and camera replacements. First set up in 1994 by two students Jeff Schwartz and Dan Wong, it captures the scenery of the San Francisco State University and uploads it to a dedicated website. It was nearly shut down in 2019 as the creators said they faced difficulties in maintaining the webcam. Following public outcry, the university agreed to take over ownership and continue its maintenance.

== Operation ==
The webcam is stationed at San Francisco State University, capturing student life and occasionally San Francisco's common fog. Every 20 seconds, a low-resolution (less than 320 by 200 pixels) image is taken and uploaded to its website and the previous image is deleted. (Note: Since July 14, 2026, an unofficial, self-hosted website has saved all FogCam images. The FogCam site itself deletes each picture when the next one is uploaded, so no official archive of past images exists. The archive states that it is not affiliated with FogCam or San Francisco State University.) The camera has been moved several times partly due to pressures from the administration. Previous locations include a student health center with a view of the Tapia Drive, the Cafe Rosso line as a nod to the Trojan Room Coffee Pot webcam, the library overlooking Holloway Avenue, and the ground floor of the humanities building. According to Schwartz, students used FogCam for practical purposes like checking the length of the line at the Cafe Rosso and looking for free parking spaces. When camera replacements are made, the university opts for a dated model to stay true to its origins. However, the software has not been modified since its inception.

== History ==
On September 30, 1994, two then–San Francisco State University students Jeff "Webdog" Schwartz and Dan "Danno" Wong, founded FogCam in the university's Department of Instructional Technologies as part of their master's thesis. They were studying for a Master's Degree in the Graduate College of Education. Their initial setup involved a Connectix QuickCam connected to a Macintosh computer sourced from the campus's bookstore, and a custom software. They were inspired by the very first live webcam, which streamed pictures of the Trojan Room Coffee Pot in the University of Cambridge.

After graduation, Wong was hired for the Academic Technologies department and continued to maintain the webcam. FogCam was initially placed in the Burk Hall, and it has moved locations multiple times. In 1995, Schwartz placed a similar webcam in his residence to keep track of his two cats. Guinness World Records recognized FogCam as the "longest-running webcam" in 2008.

FogCam!
(@FogCam)
tweeted:

After 25 years, Fogcam is shutting down forever at the end of August. Webdog & Danno thank our viewers and San Francisco State University for their support over the years. The Internet has changed a lot since 1994, but Fogcam will always have a special place in its history.

August 18, 2019

=== Planned shutdown and revival ===
In August 2019, the creators announced the webcam would cease operating, citing a lack of scenic spots and support from the university. They explained "the university tolerates us, but they don't really endorse us and so we have to find secure locations on our own." The shutdown was planned on August 30, though the website would continue to be online "for the sake of posterity." The announcement was met with public outcry, as multiple news outlets reported on the news. The official university Twitter account started the hashtag #SaveTheFogCam and few offered donations. On August 28, Schwartz agreed to transfer the webcam's ownership to the university. The Department of Instructional Technologies, which as of 2022 is still Wong's workplace, now runs the webcam.

When SFGate journalist Amanda Bartlett visited FogCam on September 20, 2022, it was stationed on the second floor of a conference room within the business building. Bartlett commented that the webcam looked "humble" compared to the public outcry it received. She described it as a Logitech camera being held up by a "flexible plastic tripod".

== Reception ==
In 2019, NPR noted that FogCam was "commonly credited as the world's oldest webcam in operation" and "one of the oldest websites, period". The New York Times noted FogCam's novelty at the time, commenting that it "didn't do much of anything special, which was part of its quirky charm". Digital Trends compared FogCam to Lou Montulli's The Amazing Fishcam, which was also established in 1994, shortly after FogCam. Jenny Vogel wrote in Journal of the New Media Caucus that while FogCam was "unspectacular", the live nature of the media was "often more interesting or appealing than what the image itself presented".

== See also ==
- Fishcam, webcams pointed at fish tanks
- List of websites founded before 1995
