= UNC School of Information and Library Science =

Coordinates: 35°54′41.71″N 79°2′52.21″W

UNC School of Information and Library Science (SILS)
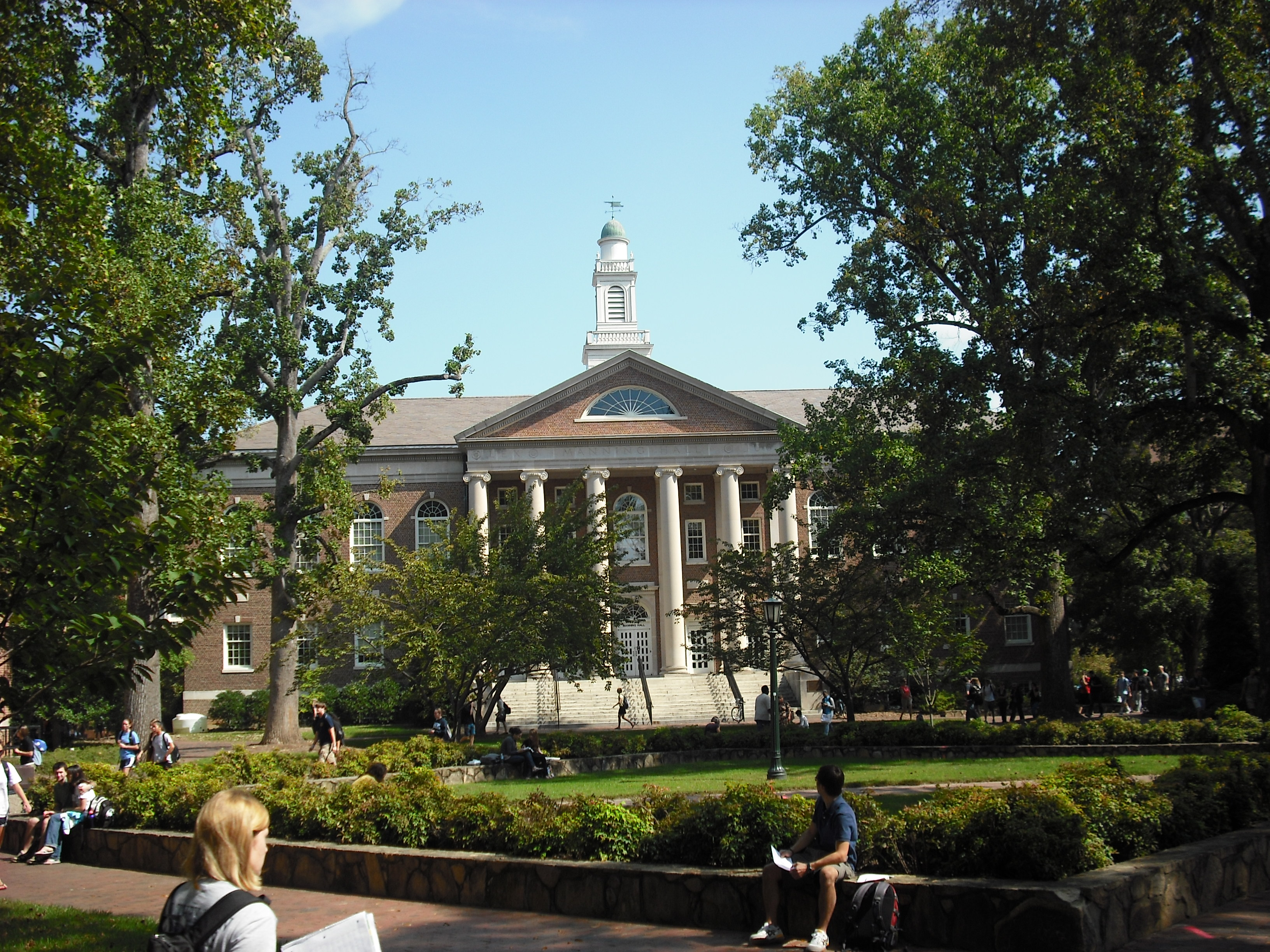
- Established: 1931
- Dean: Diane Kelly
- Academic staff: 43
- Students: 414
- Location: University of North Carolina; Chapel Hill, North Carolina
- Website: sils.unc.edu

The UNC School of Information and Library Science (SILS) is the information school of the University of North Carolina at Chapel Hill. The school offers a bachelor's degree in information science, a master's degrees in library science and information science, a master's degree in digital curation, and a doctoral degree in information and library science as well as an undergraduate minor, graduate certificate programs, and a post-masters certificate.

== History ==
The school was founded by Louis Round Wilson and opened in the fall of 1931. The U.S. News & World Report ranks the third among information and library science programs nationwide, as well as first in digital librarianship and health librarianship.

=== Accreditation ===
Degree programs are accredited by the American Library Association (ALA). The Master of Science in Library Science (MSLS) has maintained its ALA accreditation since 1934, and the Master of Science in Information Science (MSIS) program has maintained accreditation since its inception in 2000. There were 26 full-time teaching faculty members and about 17 adjunct and visiting faculty members at SILS in 2017.

The school officially changed its name from the School of Library Science to the School of Information and Library Science in 1988 after a faculty vote in 1987, recognizing the growing role information management would have on society.

Now, SILS offers an undergraduate major and minor, two master's of science degrees, professional science master's degrees, dual master's degrees with both their undergraduate degree and other programs at the University, several graduate certificates, and a doctor of philosophy in information and library science. One of SILS' newest degrees, a professional science master's (PSM) in digital curation, is the first master's degree in the nation focused on digital curation and is offered entirely online.

In the fall of 2017, SILS had 160 undergraduate students either pursuing a major in information science or a minor in information systems, with an additional 254 graduate students enrolled.

=== Deans ===
- Louis Round Wilson (1931-1932)
- Susan Grey Akers (1932-1954)
- Lucile Kelling Henderson (1954-1960)
- Carlyle J. Frarey (1960-1964)
- Margaret Ellen Kalp (1964-1967)
- Walter A. Sedelow Jr. (1967-1970)
- Raymond L. Carpenter Jr. (1970-1971)
- Edward G. Holley (1972-1985)
- Evelyn H. Daniel (1985-1990)
- Barbara B. Moran (1990-1998)
- Joanne Gard Marshall (1999-2004)
- Jose-Marie Griffiths (2004-2009)
- Barbara B. Moran (2009-2010)
- Gary Marchionini (2010–2024)
- Jeffrey Bardzell (2024-2025)
- Diane Kelly (2025-2026)

== Facilities ==
In 1995, Manning would undergo renovations, including updating its large lecture hall and the information and technology resource center. Today, SILS classrooms are equipped with computer projection and instructor workstations. SILS also maintains a wireless network with access points throughout the building. Since 2016, SILS has offered students the opportunity to experience virtual reality, expanding to offer an entire virtual reality room in 2017. SILS also has a 3D printing station, where students can submit designs of 3D models to be printed. Additionally, SILS offers a Digital Media Lab with access to professional video and audio recording equipment, a teleprompter, green screen, audio mixer, and video and audio editing software. As part of the university library system, the SILS Library features advanced electronic capabilities and an extensive collection of materials. The Information and Technology Resource Center integrates a computer lab and electronic classroom area with extensive library collections and services.

=== Library ===
The SILS Library consists of over 100,000 volumes and approximately 1,300 serials titles are checked in every year. One of the collections SILS houses is the professional collection (Library of Congress classification), which consists of materials in information and library science, and related fields. The juvenile collection (Dewey Decimal Classification), designed to support courses in children's literature, school librarianship, and children's librarianship in public libraries, consists of the Easy collection, juvenile fiction, juvenile non-fiction, juvenile historical (non-circulating), pop-up books, and audio-visual materials. It is the only full-service children's collection on campus.

== Projects ==
=== Digital Project Repository ===
The SILS Digital Project Repository was created by information and library science graduate students at the University of North Carolina at Chapel Hill (originally developed by SILS students Matthew Bachtell and Ying Zhang for Dr. Gary Marchionini's Digital Libraries course). The DPR serves as an archive and showcase of student work. The "Pathfinder Digital Library", as it was then called, housed two archived pathfinders and provided organized lists of externally linked pathfinders. The project was later taken over by SILS students Becca Cahill, Adam Webb, and Kristen Wilson, who renamed it the SILS Digital Project Repository (DPR) and expanded its scope to include portals, digital archives, and other HTML format projects. These students archived about sixty pathfinders and other projects during their administration of the site in hopes of preserving projects housed on impermanent student webspace. In spring 2006, the DPR was adopted by Lori Eakin, Emily Riley, and Ellen Whisler, who worked to collect detailed metadata for projects housed on-site and off-site in preparation for future development of the DPR.

=== ibiblio.org ===
ibiblio, a collaboration between the University of North Carolina at Chapel Hill and the Center for the Public Domain, has been a vehicle for knowledge sharing since 1992, first as an original Sun Microsystems SunSITE, then as Metalab, finally resting on the ibiblio name in 2000. ibiblio is a free and vibrant exchange of ideas among a large community of contributors who share their knowledge across disciplines. It is one of the major distribution hubs for Linux software and has been a significant supporter of Linux development efforts since its inception. In addition, it started the first internet radio stream by rebroadcasting WXYC, the UNC student-run radio station. It also takes credit for the first non-commercial IPv6 / Internet2 radio stream. The site, which enters its 19th year of existence in October, is run by the School of Information and Library Science and the School of Media and Journalism, by director and UNC professor Paul Jones.

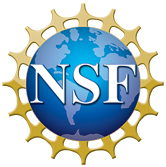
National Science Foundation Logo

=== LifeTime Library ===
LifeTime Library is an online comprehensive file-hosting site that is available to the school's incoming students. The program is designed to store documents and photos for students so they can have access to them forever. Gary Marchionini, dean of the school, said LifeTime Library is the first program of its kind to be used by a university in the nation. With the program, students can permanently store and later retrieve computer files that are usually kept on hard drives and social media sites. The program's data is stored on a series of disks managed by the school and other departments. Two years in the making, the LifeTime Library has benefited from research projects funded by the National Science Foundation and other prestigious sources. Users can fine-tune their libraries, setting up policies and new capabilities, and therefore Marchionini expects the libraries to provide new learning experiences for the school's students. Eventually, researchers would like to see it synchronize with multiple devices. Business partners may be recruited to help with costs.

=== DigCCurr ===
This three-year program brings together key international figures in digital preservation from the United States, Canada, the United Kingdom, the Netherlands, Italy, and New Zealand, to serve on an Advisory Board. serve to integrate the curriculum and the experiential components at UNC-CH.

=== DataNet ===
In October 2011, the National Science Foundation awarded nearly $8 million over five years to the DataNet Federation Consortium, a group that spans seven universities, to build and deploy a prototype national data management infrastructure. About half of the award supports research and development at the school. This consortium (led by The Data Intensive Cyber Environments research group at SILS) addresses the research collaboration needs of six science and engineering disciplines: oceanography, hydrology, engineering design, plant biology, cognitive science, and social science. The infrastructure project supports collaborative multi-disciplinary research through shared collections, data publication within digital libraries, and development of reference collections in archives.

=== Collaboration with RENCI ===
RENCI at UNC-Chapel Hill opened in the summer 2007 in the new Manning Information Technology Services building located on South Campus. The site supports the use of visualization technology and advanced computational methods to explore issues in science, engineering, the arts, humanities, and social sciences. This state-of-the-art facility gives RENCI the opportunity to collaborate with UNC faculty on new and existing multidisciplinary research projects. The institution works with scientists who study critical issues and form research teams that involve faculty members at universities across North Carolina and the U.S. and that are positioned to bring major research projects to North Carolina. In October 2012, SILS professor & RENCI chief scientist Arcot Rajasekar is the principal investigator of one of eight new Big Data research projects receiving awards from the National Science Foundation (NSF) with support from the National Institutes of Health (NIH). Rajasekar's project, “DataBridge – A Sociometric System for Long-Tail Science Data Collections,” will use socio-metric networks similar to LinkedIn or Facebook to enable scientists to find data and like-minded research. It is expected to improve the discovery of relevant scientific data across large, distributed, and diverse collections. The funds provided by NSF for the DataBridge project total $1.5 million.

== Programs ==
=== Undergraduate Program ===
UNC-Chapel Hill is the only university in the state of North Carolina offering a bachelor's degree in information science, to prepare its graduates for a variety of careers in the information industry, including information architecture, database design and implementation, Web design and implementation, and information consulting, as well as for graduate study. The Minor in Information Systems provides students with an understanding of computing, multi¬media, electronic information resources, and the Internet that complements the student's major field of study. Students concentrate their studies in the junior and senior years.

=== Dual Bachelor-Master's Program ===
Introduced in 2011, the Dual Bachelor's - Master's program is intended to enable Information Science (IS) majors to obtain both their BS and MS degree by early planning of an undergraduate program that integrates well with the graduate degree requirements for either an MSIS or an MSLS within five years. Of the 24 iSchools in North America, only four offer an accelerated Bachelor's - Master's program of any sort; and other than these four iSchools, only one of the 58 programs accredited by the American Library Association offers an accelerated Bachelor's - Master's program.

=== Graduate Program ===
- The Master of Science in Library Science (MSLS) is a 48-credit hour, two-year program. The MSLS curriculum trains students in the collection, organization, storage, and retrieval of recorded knowledge for a variety of institutions and groups.
- The Master of Science in Information Science (MSIS) Program is a 48-credit hour, two-year program. The MSIS curriculum trains students in the theory and practice of analyzing, organizing, representing, and retrieving information.
- The Professional Science Master's (PSM) in Digital Curation is a 31-credit hour program. Students can take classes part-time or full-time and the program is completely online. The PSM in digital curation enables students to acquire the core skills, knowledge, and competencies for ensuring the longevity, authenticity, discoverability, and usability of digital assets.
- The Post-Masters Certificate in Information and Library Science is a 30-credit-hour program intended for students who already hold a master's degree and who want to specialize or focus on a particular area within information and library science.
- The Doctor of Philosophy in Information and Library Science is a flexible and customizable course of study designed for individuals to work in academia and high-level research centers.

=== Archives and Record Management ===
The Concentration of Study in Archives and Record Management (ARM) at SILS provides students with the knowledge and skills required to work in archives, special collections, historical societies, records management units within organizations, and various other curatorial environments. The principles and practices of ARM are based on provenance, collection-level arrangement, and attention to context, all of which are becoming increasingly relevant with the massive explosion of information across all sectors of society.

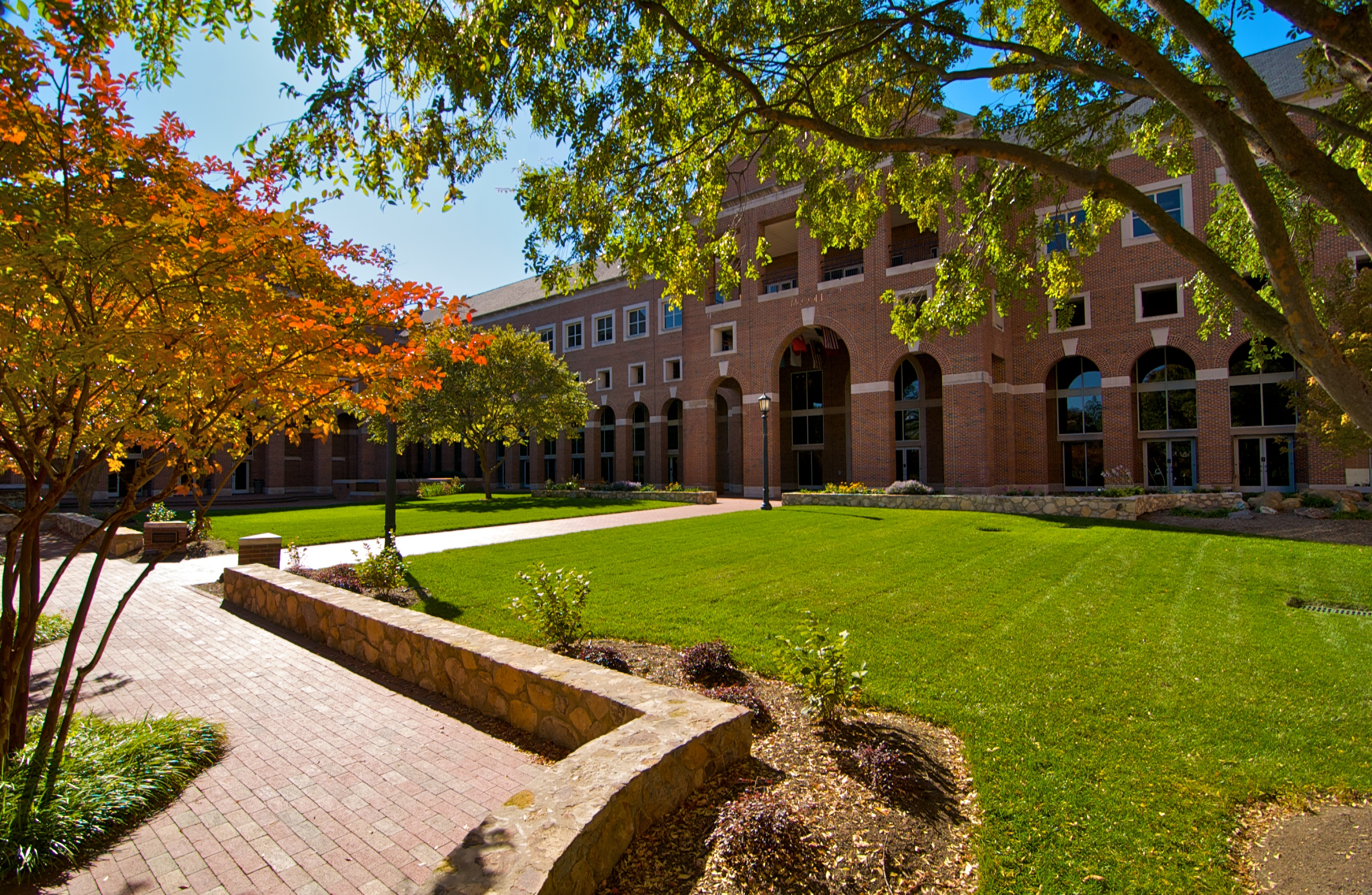
Kenan-Flagler Business School, one of the many school SILS students can obtain dual degrees from.

=== Other programs ===
==== Dual Degrees ====
In addition to the programs above, SILS also allows students to pursue two master's degrees simultaneously. Art History, Business Administration, Government, Health Policy, Law, Medicine, Nursing and Public History are the degrees that SILS students can pursue simultaneously with their master's degree from SILS. Students are required to apply to both schools separately, that they enroll in only one program in any given semester, that they confer with dual degree coordinators for both programs and are able to "double count" up to 20% of credits across degrees. The goal of dual degrees is to maximize learning, minimize course and content overlap, and provide students with a means to earn two degrees as efficiently as possible while maintaining the integrity and high standards of each degree and are designed to be completed in three academic years.

==== Certificates ====
The Post-Master's Certificate (PMC) is a post-masters degree that is designed for practitioners who seek a continuing education program to enhance their professional development in Information and Library Science. The PMC is a hybrid program with residential and online components. The typical pattern begins with a two-week intensive kick-off offered during the first session of summer school on campus and then includes a set of courses taken online. The PMC allows students to customize their coursework depending on their goals. The main requirement of the program is the successful completion of an additional 30 hours of coursework.

SILS also offers several certificates of specialization programs that allow currently enrolled master's students to develop strength in predefined areas of concentration in information and library science. Completion of the requirements for a certificate results in an endorsement on the student's transcript. These certificates are intended for students enrolled in the master's program, as well as those with master's degrees, who wish to acquire expertise in addition to the normal master's degree and receive recognition for this training. Programs include Aging, Bioinformatics, Clinical Information Science, and Digital Curation, among other specialized programs.

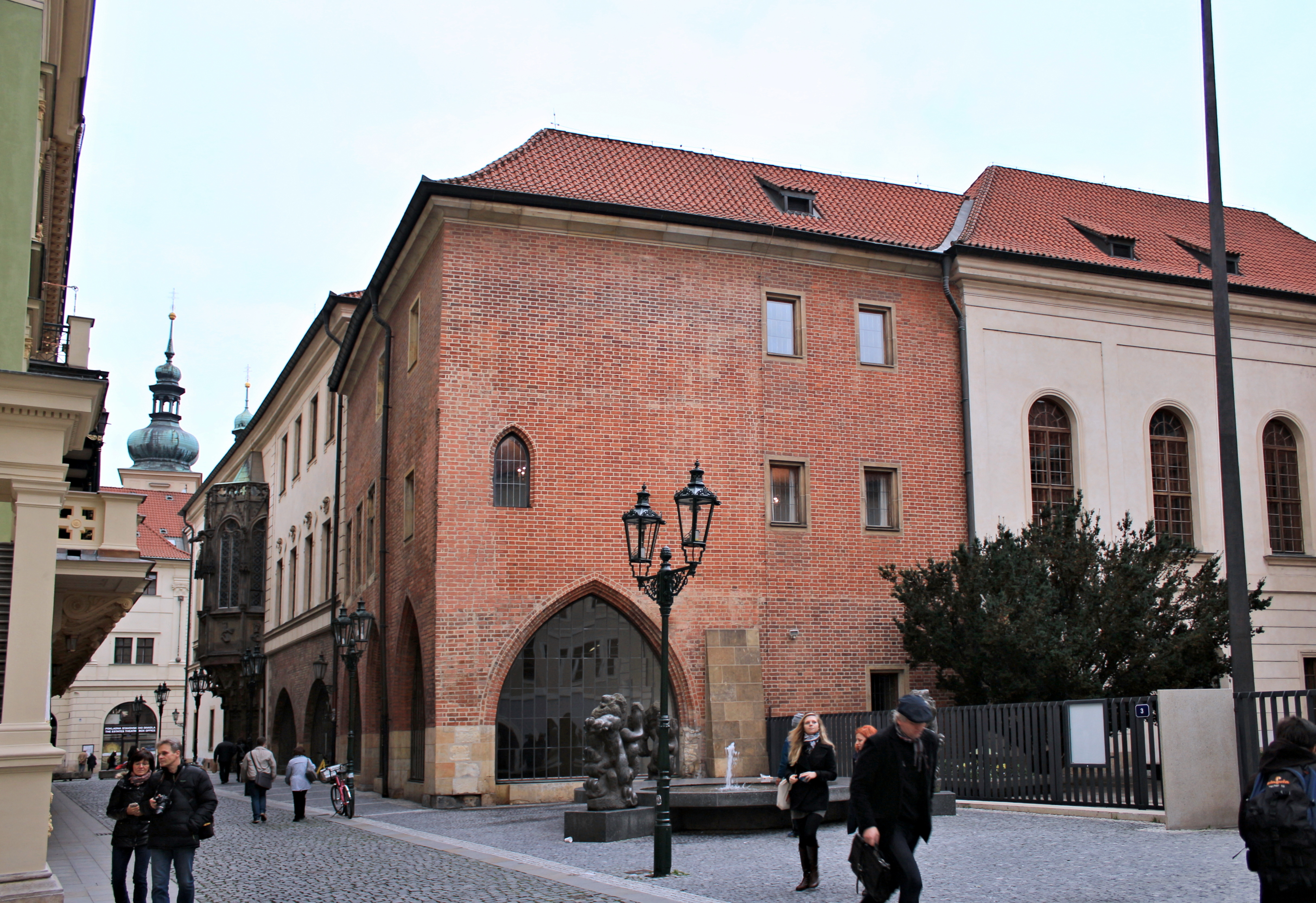
Charles University, Prague, Czech Republic

=== International Opportunities ===
The very first international summer semester in the Czech Republic, co-sponsored by Charles University, began in Prague in 2002 for SILS students. Today, the school hosts seminars each year in London, England, and Charles University in Prague, the Czech Republic. Exchange opportunities are also available at schools in Denmark, Finland, Slovenia, Spain, and the Czech Republic. The schools that SILS has formal study abroad agreements with are: Royal School of Library and Information Science in Copenhagen, Denmark, Charles University in Prague, Czech Republic, The Department of Library Science, Information Science and Book Studies at the University of Ljubljana in Slovenia, and the University of Carlos III in Madrid, Spain. In addition, UNC-Chapel Hill has formal university ties with approximately 75 other universities—many of them with library and information science schools—where SILS students can spend a semester studying abroad.

== iSchool consortium ==
UNC-SILS is a member of an international group of iSchools. The iSchools organization was founded in 2005 by a collective of Information Schools dedicated to advancing the information field in the 21st century. These schools, colleges, and departments have been newly created or are evolving from programs formerly focused on specific tracks such as information technology, library science, informatics, and information science. While each individual iSchool has its strengths and specializations, they share a fundamental interest in the relationships between information, people, and technology. The iSchools organization is governed by the iCaucus. The criteria for being recognized as an iSchool are not rigid but the schools are expected to have substantial sponsored research activity, engagement in the training of future researchers (usually through an active, research-oriented doctoral program), and a commitment to progress in the information field.

== Notable faculty members ==
- Elfreda Chatman, information scientist
- Edward G. Holley, librarian
- Paul Jones, computer technologist
- Gary Marchionini, information scientist
- Tressie McMillan Cottom, sociologist
- Helen Tibbo, archivist
- Zeynep Tufekci, techno-sociologist
- Mohammad Hossein Jarrahi, information scientist

== See also ==
- Information school
