= Shlomo Yaffe =

Orthodox Jewish Rabbi

Rabbi Shlomo Yaffe

Personal life
- Born: Brooklyn, New York City, New York, United States
- Spouse: Chana Yaffe
- Occupation: Rabbi, educator, lecturer, author

Religious life
- Religion: Judaism
- Denomination: Orthodox Judaism

Jewish leader
- Position: Rabbi
- Synagogue: Congregation B'nai Torah
- Organisation: Institute of American and Talmudic Law
- Began: 2017
- Main work: Living with Integrity (lead author)
- Other: Rabbinical Director, Massachusetts Kashrut Commission; Former Scholar-in-Residence, Chabad at Harvard University
- Semikhah: Tomchei Temimim Lubavitch (1989)

Rabbi Shlomo Yaffe is an American Orthodox rabbi, educator, lecturer, and author. He serves as dean of the Institute of American and Talmudic Law in New York City and rabbi of Congregation B'nai Torah in Longmeadow, Massachusetts. He is also Rabbinical Director of the Massachusetts Kashrut Commission and has previously served as scholar-in-residence to Chabad at Harvard University, serving the Harvard and Massachusetts Institute of Technology communities.

== Early life and education ==
Yaffe was born in Brooklyn, New York, and was raised in Portland, Maine, and Los Angeles, California.

He studied at yeshivot in Miami, London, and New York and received rabbinic ordination (semikhah) from Tomchei Temimim Lubavitch in Brooklyn in 1989. While studying there, he was selected as one of fourteen members of the institution's Kanei HaMenorah honor society.

From 1990 to 1992, Yaffe was a fellow of the post-ordination program at the Leeds Kollel in Leeds, West Yorkshire, England, where he pursued advanced studies in areas including medical ethics and kosher supervision.

== Career ==
Yaffe has held rabbinic positions in both the United Kingdom and the United States. He served as rabbi of Hull Hebrew Congregation in Hull, England, before returning to the United States.

In Connecticut, Yaffe served as rabbi of Young Israel of Hartford and Congregation Agudas Achim of West Hartford. He also served as director of the Hartford Kashrut Commission, taught Judaic studies at the Hebrew High School of New England, and was chaplain to the Hartford Fire Department.

Yaffe later became scholar-in-residence to Chabad at Harvard, where he worked with students and faculty associated with Harvard University and the Massachusetts Institute of Technology.

He subsequently became dean of the Institute of American and Talmudic Law, an educational organization focused on the relationship between Jewish law and contemporary legal, scientific, medical, and public-policy issues. In that role, he has participated in legal and educational forums and has appeared on panels with members of the American judiciary, including U.S. Supreme Court Justice Antonin Scalia.

In 2017, Congregation B'nai Torah of Longmeadow, Massachusetts, appointed Yaffe as its rabbi and spiritual leader. He has also served as Rabbinical Director of the Massachusetts Kashrut Commission.

== Writing and public scholarship ==
Yaffe has lectured and conducted seminars throughout North America, as well as in Europe, Africa, Latin America, Asia, Australia, and South Africa. He has written extensively on Jewish law, ethics, theology, and contemporary public issues, and has been a contributor to Chabad.org.

He served as lead author of the Rohr Jewish Learning Institute's educational course Living with Integrity. His work frequently explores the application of traditional Jewish legal and ethical principles to modern legal, medical, scientific, and public-policy questions.

Following the October 7 attacks in Israel, Yaffe wrote about Jewish solidarity, Israel–Diaspora relations, and religious perspectives on the Land of Israel in an essay published by Lubavitch International in 2024.

== Personal life ==
Yaffe resides in Massachusetts with his wife, Chana, and their children.
