= Trinity Journal =

Trinity Journal may refer to:

- Trinity Journal (webzine), defunct webzine
- Trinity Journal (theology), journal of Trinity Evangelical Divinity School
- Trinity Journal (newspaper), newspaper based in Trinity County, California
- A journal published by the Trinity School for Ministry
