= Zombo =

Zombo may refer to:

- Zombo, Angola, a town in Uíge Province in Angola
- Zombo District, a district in West Nile sub-region, Northern Uganda
- Zombo, Uganda, the largest town in Zombo District and the location of the district headquarters.
- Zombo (character), a 2000 AD story
- Zombo (singer) (1979–2008), a South African musician
- Zombo.com, a website consisting of a Flash animation

== Surname ==
- Frank Zombo (born 1987), an American football linebacker
- Rick Zombo (born 1963), a retired American ice hockey defenseman
