= Bob Young (businessman) =

Canadian businessman (born 1953/1954)

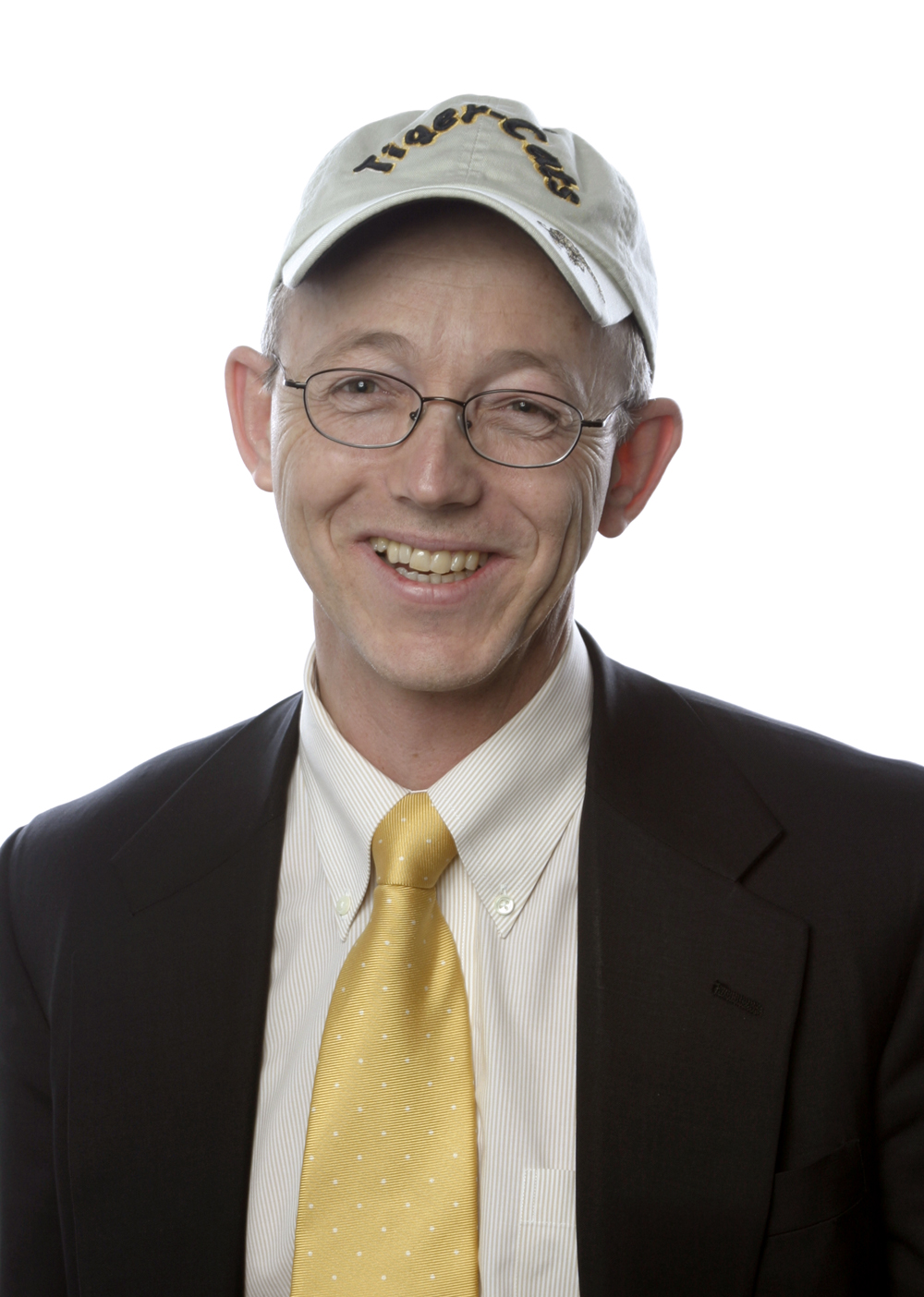
- Young in 2010
- Born: 1953 or 1954 (age 71–72); Hamilton, Ontario, Canada
- Education: Victoria College
- Alma mater: Victoria College University of Toronto
- Occupations: Businessman, entrepreneur
- Years active: 1984-present
- Known for: Founder of Red Hat and Lulu; Ownership of Forge FC and Hamilton Tiger-Cats

Robert Young (born 1953/1954) is a businessman who is best known for founding Red Hat Inc., the open source software company. He owns the franchises for Forge FC of the Canadian Premier League as well as the Hamilton Tiger-Cats of the Canadian Football League for which he is self-styled caretaker of the team.

== Early life ==
He was born in Hamilton, Ontario, Canada. He attended Trinity College School in Port Hope, Ontario. He received a Bachelor of Arts from Victoria College at the University of Toronto.

== Career ==
Prior to Red Hat, Young built a couple of computer rental and leasing businesses, including founding Vernon Computer Rentals in 1984. Descendants of Vernon are still operating under that name. After leaving Vernon, Young founded the ACC Corp Inc. in 1993.

Marc Ewing and Young co-founded open-source software company Red Hat. Red Hat was a member of the S&P 500 Index before being purchased by IBM on July 9, 2019. Marc Ewing and Young's partnership started in 1994 when ACC acquired the Red Hat trademarks from Ewing. In early 1995, ACC changed its name to Red Hat Software, which has subsequently been shortened to simply Red Hat, Inc. Young was Red Hat's CEO until 1999.

In 2002, Young founded Lulu.com, a print-on-demand, self-publishing company, and was CEO. In 2006, Young established the Lulu Blooker Prize, a book prize for books that began as blogs. He launched the prize partly as a means to promote Lulu.

Young was CEO of PrecisionHawk, a commercial drone technology company, from 2015 to 2017. Prior to being named PrecisionHawk's CEO in 2015, he was an early investor in the company. He continues on its board as chairman.

Young also co-founded Linux Journal in 1994, and in 2003, he purchased the Hamilton Tiger-Cats of the Canadian Football League. In 2022, he sold minority stakes in the Tiger-Cats to Jim Lawson, team President Scott Mitchell, and American steel manufacturer Stelco.

Young focuses his philanthropic efforts on access to information and advancement of knowledge. In 1999, he co-founded The Center for the Public Domain. Young has supported the Creative Commons, Public Knowledge.org, the Dictionary of Old English, Loran Scholarship Foundation, ibiblio.org, and the NCSU eGames, among others.

Business positions
New title	President and CEO of Red Hat; 1995 – November 15, 1999	Succeeded by Matthew Szulik
