= Paul Cormier =

Paul Cormier may refer to:

- Paul Cormier (basketball)
- Paul Cormier (engineer)
