= Christopher Caldwell =

Christopher or Chris Caldwell may refer to:

- Bob the Drag Queen (Christopher D. Caldwell, born 1986), American drag queen and winner of RuPaul's Drag Race
- Christopher Caldwell (journalist) (born 1962), American writer
- Chris Caldwell, American mathematician who maintained the website PrimePages
