= Leslie Harpold =

American writer (1966–2006)

- Leslie Harpold illustration by Jeffrey Zeldman (1998)
- Born: Leslie Louise Harpold; January 8, 1966; Royal Oak, Michigan, U.S.
- Died: December 7, 2006 (aged 40)
- Occupations: Writer, humorist, designer

Leslie Harpold (January 8, 1966 – December 7, 2006) was an early Web publisher, humorist, and designer, whose early and unexpected death raised the issue of the vulnerability of a digital legacy.

== Writing ==
Harpold was the publisher of Smug.com, an online culture and lifestyle magazine. Contributor Heidi Pollock described Smug as part of the "cultural migration from independent 'zine publishing to collaborative websites releasing curated content on a monthly basis". Harpold's work there included a very early critical piece on blogging, "Logrolling".

Her personal blog Hoopla 500, with posts describing her experience of the September 11 attacks and their aftermath, was archived by the Library of Congress in its September 11 Web Archive Collection.

She was an early victim of domain hijacking in 2001, with her website hoopla.com getting transferred because of a forged fax request, which resulted in a high-profile protest against Verisign.

In 2002, her short piece "How to Make Things Easier for Everyone" appeared in Manual, an early experiment in non-traditional anthology publishing. Harpold was noted for her work to expand the boundaries of writing and to build more connections between writers and readers, online and off. In May 1998 she participated in a three-week series of in-person readings by online writers called Web Writers in the Flesh.

Many readers since her death have become familiar with her through the work she did for sites such as The Morning News and pieces like "How to Write a Thank-You Note". Her writing on her now-defunct personal sites was also recognized, with "Possible Scenarios for Heaven" being one of the most notable.

== Design ==
She founded and led New York City design firm Fearless Media as Creative Director from 1996 to 2001. For her work with Jones Soda she won a silver medal in identity design from Print Magazine. She designed Metababy, a website that had elements of early wiki-like community and participatory performance art.

She participated as an artist in the Banner Project, the Web element of Day Without Art, from its inception. She was also known for innovative work using Powerpoint such as "Lorem Ipsum Dolor", her piece mixing the Latin text often used as filler (lorem ipsum) in unfinished documents with animation and graphics, and "Click To Add Title", her 2002 competition versus Michael Sippey in the style of a Photoshop contest.

Her design work was often deeply intertwined with her work as a writer. Harpold was a strong advocate of the need for "a personal, direct, and conversational" voice on the Web in order to make sites effective.

== Death ==
In December 2006, Harpold died unexpectedly. Her death was quickly noted as it took place during her annual online Advent calendar; Day 7 was the last one posted. At the time of her death, "Leslie Harpold" passed "Britney Spears" and "Christmas" to become the third-most searched term on Technorati. After her death her family chose not to maintain her websites or allow others to make her work available. This loss to the Web of her work raised the issue of digital estate planning for online creators.

== Influence ==
Author and editor Choire Sicha and blogger Heather Armstrong both have cited her as an influence, as have designer Jeffrey Zeldman, author Maggie Mason, writer and podcaster Merlin Mann, and engineer Chris Wetherell. Wetherell said, "Her writing beat personal ploughshares into community ploughshares that cut through my personal and professional development like a sword".

Harpold's influence on the personal Web was discussed by Christian Crumlish at the "Identity and Attention" panel at South by Southwest Interactive 2007, and it has been noted by many others, including blogging software company Six Apart in an official post praising "her unique role in the history of social media".

Many reference her piece "The Thread that Runs So True" as an important representation of the personal Web she helped form and of their own experiences with the early years of the Web.

== Bibliography ==
- Burton, Bonnie and Alan Graham (2004) Never Threaten to Eat Your Co-Workers: Best of Blogs Apress. ISBN 9781590593219
- Carroll, Evan and John Romano (2010) Your Digital Afterlife: When Facebook, Flickr and Twitter Are Your Estate, What's Your Legacy? New Riders. ISBN 9780321732286
