= Paul Jones (computer technologist) =

Paul Jones (born February 5, 1950, in Hickory, North Carolina) is a graduate of NC State University and the director of ibiblio, a contributor-run, digital library of public domain and creative commons media, administered by the Office of Information Technology Service of the University of North Carolina at Chapel Hill. On the basis of his bachelor's in computer science from NC State University and MFA from Warren Wilson College, he has become Clinical Associate Professor in the School of Journalism and Mass Communication, and Clinical Associate Professor in the School of Information and Library Science, at UNC-Chapel Hill.

Jones was the first manager of SunSITE, one of the first World Wide Web sites in North America. He is an author of The Web Server Book (Ventana, 1995), and of numerous articles about topics such as digital libraries and the Open Source movement. He is an actively publishing poet.

He is married to Sally Greene, a research lawyer and former member of the Town Council of Chapel Hill.

== See also ==
- ibiblio
- Warren Wilson College MFA Program for Writers
- Betty Adcock
- James Applewhite
- Charles Edward Eaton
- Michael McFee
- Robert Morgan (poet)
- Paul Muldoon
- Reynolds Price
- Sam Ragan
- David Rigsbee
- Norman Rosten
- R. T. Smith
