= Mirsky's Worst of the Web =

Former website

- Website type: Entertainment
- Available in: English
- Website: mirsky.com
- Commercial: Yes
- Launched: 1995

Mirsky's Worst of the Web (WOTW) was a website devoted to showcasing what David Mirsky, a former Harvard Lampoon writer, considered "the worst web sites ever". WOTW was the first well-trafficked site to feature bad web sites for entertainment purposes. His commentary was short on constructive criticism and long on insulting the web site layout, content and graphics, and sometimes the web designers themselves.

== Website ==
WOTW was created by Mirsky in January 1995, in response to sites such as Glenn Davis's Cool Site of the Day. The format was simple: three days a week, Mirsky would select about three new sites, providing links and one-sentence comments that were "acidic, addictive, and insanely funny". For some time, at least, this was a paid job, supported by web service provider Volant.

The site's tagline was "If it isn't Mirsky's then it isn't the worst!"

An article about the site gives some of its flavor:

There's a page with fuzzy photos celebrating the (unremarkable) renovation of a restaurant's dining room, which neglects to give the restaurant's name anywhere except in the small-print hypertext links at the bottom. There's one detailing a hamster's courageous but ultimately unsuccessful battle against tuberculosis (thankfully unillustrated). And there's a page for a surgical instrument supplier with nothing on it but the cover of the Fall catalog, featuring a shot of an intrusive-looking piece of equipment superimposed over an outdoor scene, and the caption, "Reaching New Horizons" ("Maybe the manufacturers are subtly hinting that it can also be used for fishing," Mirsky cracks.)

According to several interviews, Mirsky expected WOTW to lead to money-making opportunities, and grew frustrated with maintaining it because it never did. On November 1, 1996, Mirsky stopped producing WOTW.

== See also ==
- The Useless Pages
