= Expasy =

Expert Protein-Analysis System

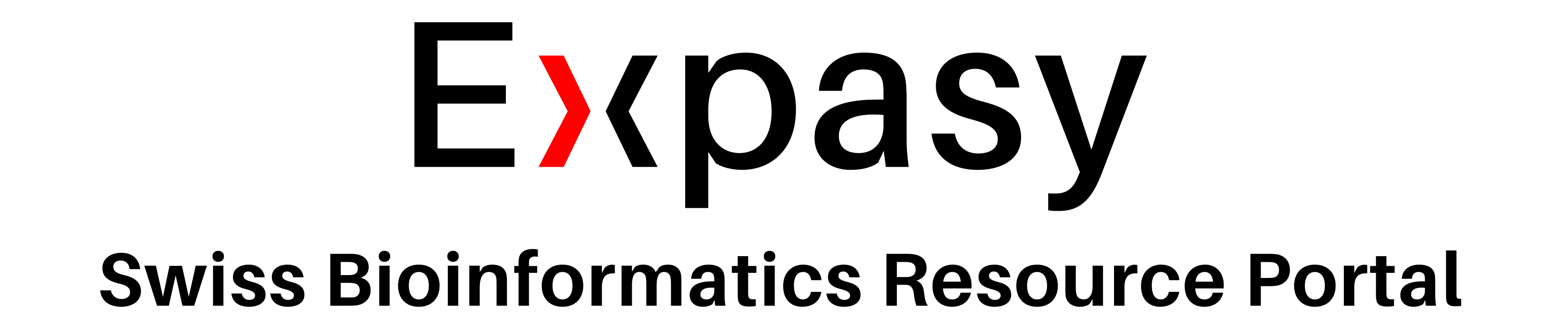
Logo Expasy 2020

Expasy is an online bioinformatics resource operated by the SIB Swiss Institute of Bioinformatics. It is an extensible and integrative portal which provides access to over 160 databases and software tools and supports a range of life science and clinical research areas, from genomics, proteomics and structural biology, to evolution and phylogeny, systems biology and medical chemistry. The individual resources (databases, web-based and downloadable software tools) are hosted in a decentralized way by different groups of the SIB Swiss Institute of Bioinformatics and partner institutions.

== Search engine ==
Queries of Expasy allow:

1. parallel searches SIB databases through a single search
2. aggregated search results from the complete set of >160 resources accessible from the portal.

Expasy provides up-to-date information from the most recent release of each resources.

The terms used in Expasy are based on the EDAM comprehensive ontology.

== History ==
Expasy was created in August 1993. Originally, it was called ExPASy (Expert Protein Analysis System) and acted as a proteomics server to analyze protein sequences and structures and two-dimensional gel electrophoresis (2-D Page electrophoresis). Among others, ExPASy hosted the protein sequence knowledge base, UniProtKB/Swiss-Prot, and its computer annotated supplement, UniProtKB/TrEMBL.

ExPASy was the first website of the life sciences and among the first 150 websites in the world. As of 5 April 2007, ExPASy had been consulted 1 billion times since its installation on 1 August 1993.

In June 2011, it became the SIB ExPASy Bioinformatics Resources Portal: a diverse catalogue of bioinformatics resources developed by SIB Groups. The current version of Expasy was released in October 2020.
