= Tzvi Freeman =

Canadian rabbi and author

- Born: Vancouver, British Columbia, Canada
- Occupation: Writer
- Writing career
- Language: English
- Years active: 1990s–present
- Genre: Non-fiction
- Subjects: Jewish mysticism, Jewish meditation, Chabad philosophy
- Notable work: Bringing Heaven Down to Earth

Tzvi Freeman is a Canadian rabbi and author associated with the Chabad-Lubavitch Hasidic movement. Freeman is known for his work as a writer and editor for Chabad.org, and is notable for his work on the topics of Jewish mysticism and Jewish meditation. Freeman's book Bringing Heaven Down to Earth, as well as his other writings and teachings, are primarily based on the teachings of Rabbi Menachem Mendel Schneerson, the seventh Rebbe of the Chabad movement. His writing style includes a blend of Kabbalah and science fiction.

== Personal life ==
Freeman was born in Vancouver, British Columbia in 1955, and became involved in New Age spirituality and practices before joining the Chabad movement in the mid-1970s. Prior to his writing career, Freeman taught Game Design and Documentation at the DigiPen Institute of Technology School of Computer Gaming in Vancouver, and conceived and designed the A to Zap! educational video game for Sunburst Communications. Freeman also served as mashpia of the West Coast Rabbinic Seminary in Los Angeles. As of January 2020, he was residing in Sandy Springs, Georgia.

== Chabad.org ==
Freeman works as a senior editor at Chabad.org, the Chabad movement's official outreach website. He works as a member of the "Ask the Rabbi" team. His writing style is described as an attempt to blend Kabbalah and science fiction, using language from computer science to explain esoteric ideas.

=== Jewish mysticism and spirituality ===
Freeman's work includes both writings as well as multimedia productions on Jewish mysticism and spirituality, emphasizing the contemplative tradition of Chabad. A section of the Chabad.org is dedicated to his video guides on Jewish meditation.

Freeman's other multimedia production on Jewish mysticism is KabbalaToons, a children's cartoon series. The series includes over 100 episodes, and in line with the Chabad mission of publicizing Chasidic teachings, the animated series is designed to make the esoteric teachings of Kabbalah accessible to children of all ages.

In another direction, Freeman's book Heaven Exposed, originally serialized on Chabad.org, blended Kabbalah and science fiction.

== Publications ==
- Bringing Heaven Down to Earth: 365 Meditations from the Teachings of the Rebbe, Menachem Mendel Schneerson (1996)
  - German: Den Himmel auf die Erde bringen: Die Weisheit des Rabbi Schneerson aus New York (2001) ISBN 9783502610731
- Men Women and Kabala: Ancient Wisdom and Practical Advice (Coronet Books Inc., 1999)
- Be Within, Stay Above: More Meditations from the Wisdom of the Rebbe (Class One Press, 2000) ISBN 9780968240823
- Heaven Exposed (Class One Press, 2004) ISBN 9780968240847
- Men, Women and Kabala: A Handbook from the Masters (Coronet, 2004) ISBN 9780968240830
- The Book of Purpose: Meditations My Rebbe Taught Me (Class One Press, 2010) ISBN 9780968240854
- Trembling with Joy: 18 Paths of Joyous Life from the Baal Shem Tov (2011)
- The Hyper-Modern Ancient With-It Traditional Haggadah (Class One Press, 2012) ISBN 9781475060942
- Wisdom to Heal the Earth: Meditations and Teachings of the Lubavitcher Rebbe (Ezra Press and Chabad.org, 2018) ISBN 9780826690036

== Views ==
=== Definition of Judaism ===
Freeman's views on the debate over the definition of Jews and Judaism goes beyond the conventional theological stance of Orthodoxy, with Freeman stating that "Judaism is not a religion." Freeman calls the notion a "modern invention" and offers a Jewish mystical view of the Jews as a single soul or body formed of the collective of Jewish individuals, where the sin of one individual is in fact the sin of the collective. For Freeman, Judaism cannot be defined as a religion as that would imply a faith and a practice of separate individuals. Similarly, although Freeman is a leading voice in the Chabad movement, he describes himself as an "unOrthodox rabbi", as he views Hasidism as a guide to the spiritual life.

=== Antisemitism ===
On the topic of antisemitism, Freeman argues that Orthodox communities must share their cultural wisdom with their non-Jewish neighbors which will enrich society in general and promote mutual respect and understanding for all communities.

=== Bar and bat mitzvah ===
Freeman views the timing of the bar and bat mitzvah rituals within Judaism as both biologically and existentially significant. The rituals, which takes place around the onset of puberty, are, according to Freeman, are also linked to the increase of "internal dialogue" and "reflective consciousness" in the young adolescent which Freeman sees as requirements for the newfound responsibilities associated with the bar and bat mitzvah initiation ritual.

== See also ==
- Simon Jacobson
- Manis Friedman
