= Telefishion =

- Genre: Slow television
- Country of origin: Hong Kong
- Original language: None
- No. of series: 1

Production
- Running time: Various
- Production company: Asia Television

Original release
- Network: ATV Home; ATV World
- Release: 15 March 1994 – 22 May 2011

Telefishion (Chinese: 魚樂無窮) is a television program in Hong Kong which was broadcast on ATV Home and ATV World and showed goldfish in a fish bowl live, accompanied by classical music. The program was aired at startups and closedowns every day, and after daytime closedowns of ATV World. It was also the first slow TV in Hong Kong.

== History ==
Telefishion was suggested by Kenneth Kwok Wai Kin(郭偉健), the CEO of Asia Television who was invited by Lim Por-yen(林百欣). Kwok thought that the competitor, the Television Broadcasts Limited's test pattern was not interesting, so he suggested showing a fishbowl with goldfishes in summertime and a stove in wintertime, to replace the test pattern when off-the-air and increase the advertising revenue of ATV. ATV decided to use the fishbowl with goldfish option and the stove option was not implemented due to safety issues.

The program was introduced in mid-March 1994, and was first aired at 4:15 a.m. on 15 March 1994 simultaneously in both Home and World channels before closedown. In 2004, as the ATV station started broadcasting 24 hours a day, the program was cancelled, 25 April 2004 being the last-time it was aired in ATV World.

In February 2011, Telefishion was aired again for a short time, broadcast in the morning. However, this TV program was cancelled in May 2011.

== See also ==
- Fishcam
