= Jim Whitehurst =

American business executive (born 1967)

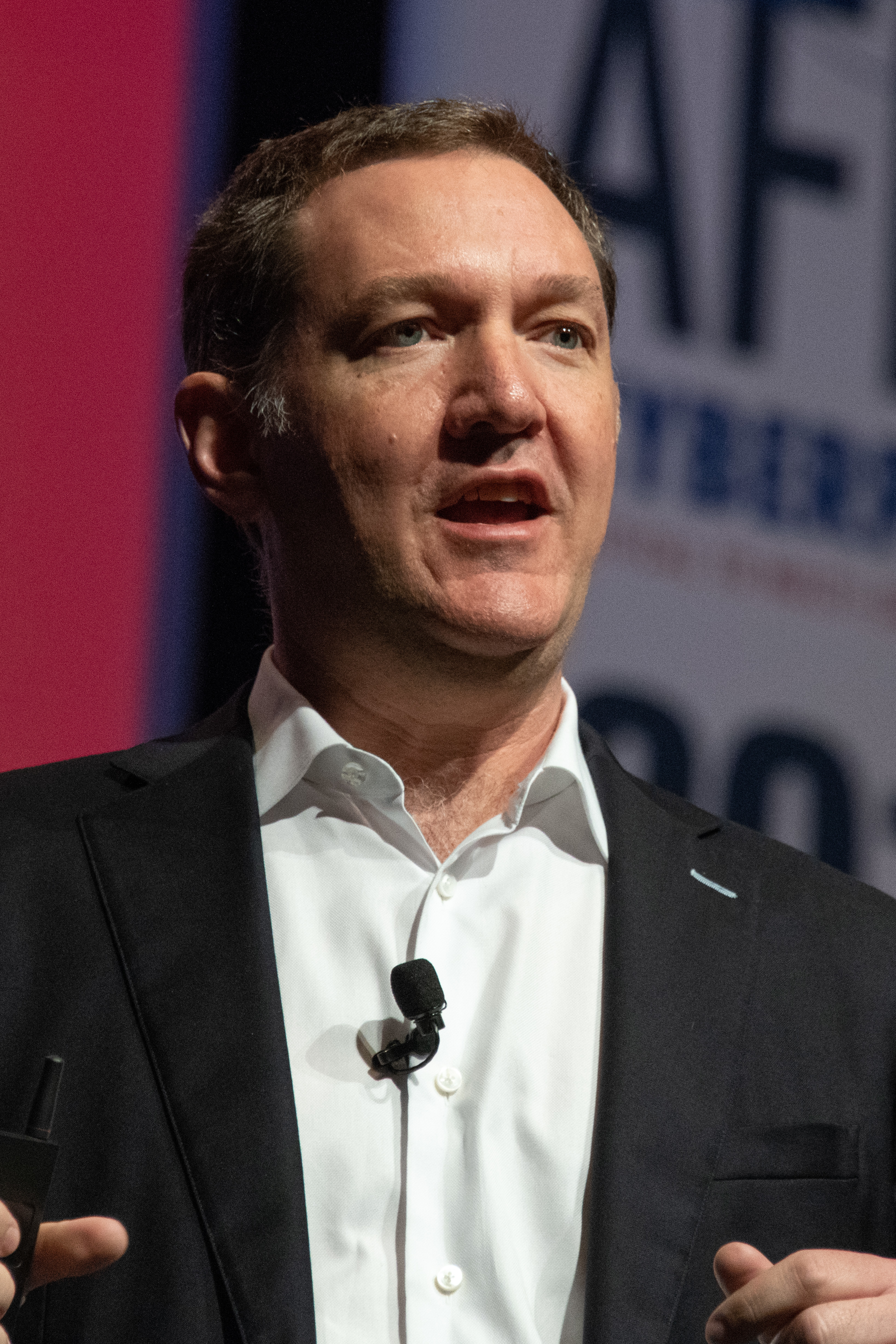
- Whitehurst in 2019
- Born: October 13, 1967 (age 59); Columbus, Georgia, U.S.
- Education: Rice University; London School of Economics; Harvard Business School
- Title: Interim CEO, Unity Technologies

James Moon Whitehurst (born October 13, 1967) is an American business executive. He has been interim chief executive officer and president of Unity Technologies since October 2023. He was previously the president at IBM, chair of the board and chief executive officer at Red Hat, and chief operating officer at Delta Air Lines. Prior to working at Delta in 2001, he was vice president and director of the Boston Consulting Group and held various management roles at its Chicago, Hong Kong, Shanghai and Atlanta offices.

During his time at Delta between 2005 and 2007, Whitehurst oversaw the company's recovery from bankruptcy and its struggle against US Airways in 2006, who had repeatedly proposed mergers to the company.

In 2013, North Carolina Governor Pat McCrory appointed Whitehurst as a member and vice-chairman of the North Carolina Economic Development Board. In 2014, Whitehurst was selected as the recipient of the NC State Park Scholarships program's William C. Friday Award.

== Early life ==
Whitehurst was born in Georgia and grew up in Columbus. He graduated from Rice University in Houston, Texas, in 1989 with a bachelor's degree in computer science and economics. He also attended University of Erlangen–Nuremberg in Erlangen, Germany, spent a year of his undergraduate education in the general course at the London School of Economics, and received an MBA from Harvard Business School.

== Career ==
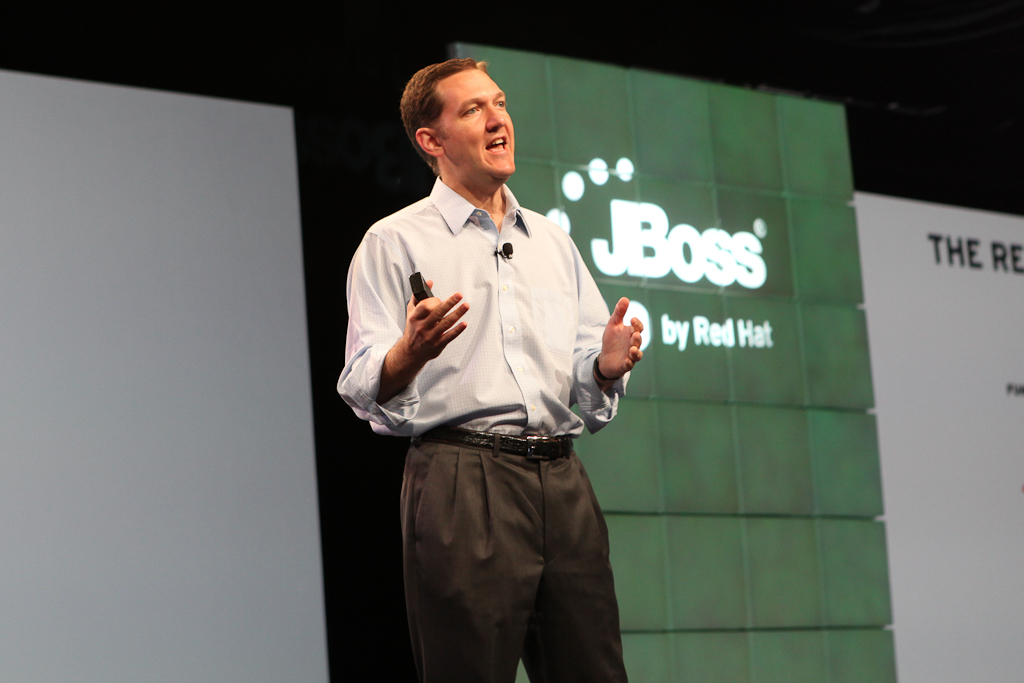
Whitehurst giving a keynote at the Red Hat Summit in 2010.

After working for the Boston Consulting Group throughout 1989 to 2001, Whitehurst began working for Delta Air Lines, where he was senior vice president, and later chief network and planning officer. He was appointed by then-CEO Gerald Grinstein in 2005 as chief operating officer, where he oversaw the company's bankruptcy and recovery from an attempted takeover from US Airways. Whitehurst became a prominent figure in the campaign known as "Keep Delta My Delta", having believed in the integrity of the company and its employees enough to resist the merger proposal and resolve the bankruptcy. He left the company on good terms in 2007.

Whitehurst joined Red Hat as CEO in December 2007. Following IBM's acquisition of Red Hat (in July 2019), later in January 2020 it was announced that Whitehurst will be appointed president of IBM on 6 April. In July 2021, Whitehurst announced his resignation from IBM.

In December 2021, he joined the board of directors at cybersecurity and systems management company Tanium as an independent director. In October 2023, he became interim CEO of Unity Technologies. As of 2023, he is also an advisor at the private equity firm Silver Lake.

== Publications ==
Whitehurst's first book, The Open Organization: Igniting Passion and Performance, was published in 2015 by Harvard Business Review.

Business positions
Preceded by Matthew Szulik	President and CEO of Red Hat; December 20, 2007 – April 6, 2020	Succeeded by Paul Cormier
