= Single-serving site =

Website serving only one purpose

A single-serving site (SSS) is a website composed of a single page with a dedicated domain name and which serves only one purpose. The term was originally coined by Jason Kottke in February 2008, although single-serving sites have existed since the dawn of the web.

== History ==
=== Origins ===
The origins of single-serving sites trace back to the creation of the World Wide Web. The oldest known single-serving site was Purple.com, which was launched in 1994. This website contained no links and its only content was a purple-colored background. In August 1995, wwwdotcom.com was launched, the first of several sites dubbed as "The Last Page of the Internet." Mike Kuniavsky launched Tired.com in November 1997. The site asks the viewer if they are tired and if so, why. In 1999, Zombo.com was launched, featuring a page with seven rotating colour wheels. Many people view this site as a parody of several other single-serving sites created in the late 1990s. Metababy was an early single-serving site that relied on user generated content.

=== Spread ===
One of the best known single-serving sites is YTMND, created in 2001. In 2007, several single-color descendants of Purple.com were launched, including SometimesRedSometimesBlue.com and LetsTurnThisFuckingWebsiteYellow.com. In February 2008, San Francisco-based writer Mathew Honan launched a single-serving site (now defunct) called Barack Obama is Your New Bicycle, which generates a random Barack Obama non sequitur.

== See also ==
- List of internet phenomena
- Microsite – Type of website
- Single-page application
