= Matthew Szulik =

American businessman

Matthew J. Szulik
- Education: Saint Anselm College
- Title: Former President and CEO, Red Hat

Matthew J. Szulik is an American businessman. He is the former chairman of Red Hat, leader of some other technology companies, such as Interleaf and MapInfo for more than 20 years. Szulik had also held the titles of chief executive officer and president of Red Hat, and after over nine years, resigned from these positions on December 20, 2007, citing personal reasons.

Szulik is a spokesperson to industry, government, and education leaders on open source computing.

Szulik is the chairman of the Science and Technology Board for State of North Carolina's Economic Development Board. He is past chairman and an executive director of the North Carolina Electronics and Information Technologies Association.

Szulik is a graduate of Saint Anselm College in New Hampshire.

In 2002, Szulik was recognized by CIO magazine with its 20/20 Vision Award.

Szulik was awarded overall national winner for Ernst & Young Entrepreneur Of The Year 2008.

Business positions
Preceded by Bob Young	President and CEO of Red Hat; November 15, 1999 - December 20, 2007	Succeeded by Jim Whitehurst
