= List of leaders of Red Hat =

Leaders of American software company

Red Hat, Inc. is an American software company that provides open source software products to enterprises.

== Presidents and CEOs ==
Since its foundation in 1995, Red Hat leadership has consisted of a president and CEO.

President and CEO of Red Hat, Inc
No.	Name	Took office	Left office	Role	Ref.
1	Bob Young	1995	November 15, 1999	President and CEO	
2	Matthew Szulik	November 15, 1999	December 20, 2007	President and CEO	
3	Jim Whitehurst	December 20, 2007	April 6, 2020	President and CEO	
4	Paul Cormier	April 6, 2020	July 12, 2022	President and CEO	
5	Matt Hicks	July 12, 2022	Present	President and CEO	
