= Zetta (cloud backup) =

Zetta, Inc.
- Founded: 2008
- Founders: Jeff Whitehead, Lou Montulli, Jason Harrison, Jeff Treuhaft
- Headquarters: Sunnyvale, California, United States
- Number of employees: 11-50
- Website: https://zetta-net.com/

Previous logo

Zetta is an American company specializing in cloud-based backup and disaster recovery for small and mid-sized businesses, enterprises, and MSPs.

== Products ==
Zetta provides cloud backup and disaster recovery services, on-premises backup and archiving and is most notable for its network efficient data transfer. It uses lightweight agent software to replicate customer data, creating a second copy in Zetta's bi-coastal enterprise-grade data centers that is available for recovery after a data loss event, such as a server crash or natural disaster. Zetta's end-to-end disaster recovery service provides deployment-to-failback coverage and features upfront network, firewall, VPN connectivity configuration and automated disaster recovery testing. The software supports Windows, Linux, and Mac and has plug-ins for SQL, MS Exchange, Hyper-V, VMware, and NetApp filers.

== Technology ==
Zetta has been awarded several patents for its backup and disaster recovery technology, including for minimizing network bandwidth for replication/backup, ensuring that the data that is replicated is the same, bit for bit, as on the source system and is able to scale to Internet volumes of data.

Zetta's agent eliminates network round trips by having a client side cache of the server state, extensive parallelism and WAN optimization. Zetta also provides a mountable backup.

== History ==
Zetta was founded in 2008 in Sunnyvale, California by Jeff Whitehead, Lou Montulli, and Jason Harrison. The current CEO is Mike Grossman. Investors in Zetta include Sigma Partners, Foundation Capital, and Industry Ventures. In July 2017, Marlin Equity Partners announced the merger of Zetta with Arcserve, based in Eden Prairie, Minnesota.
