= Ibiblio =

Digital library and archive project

ibiblio

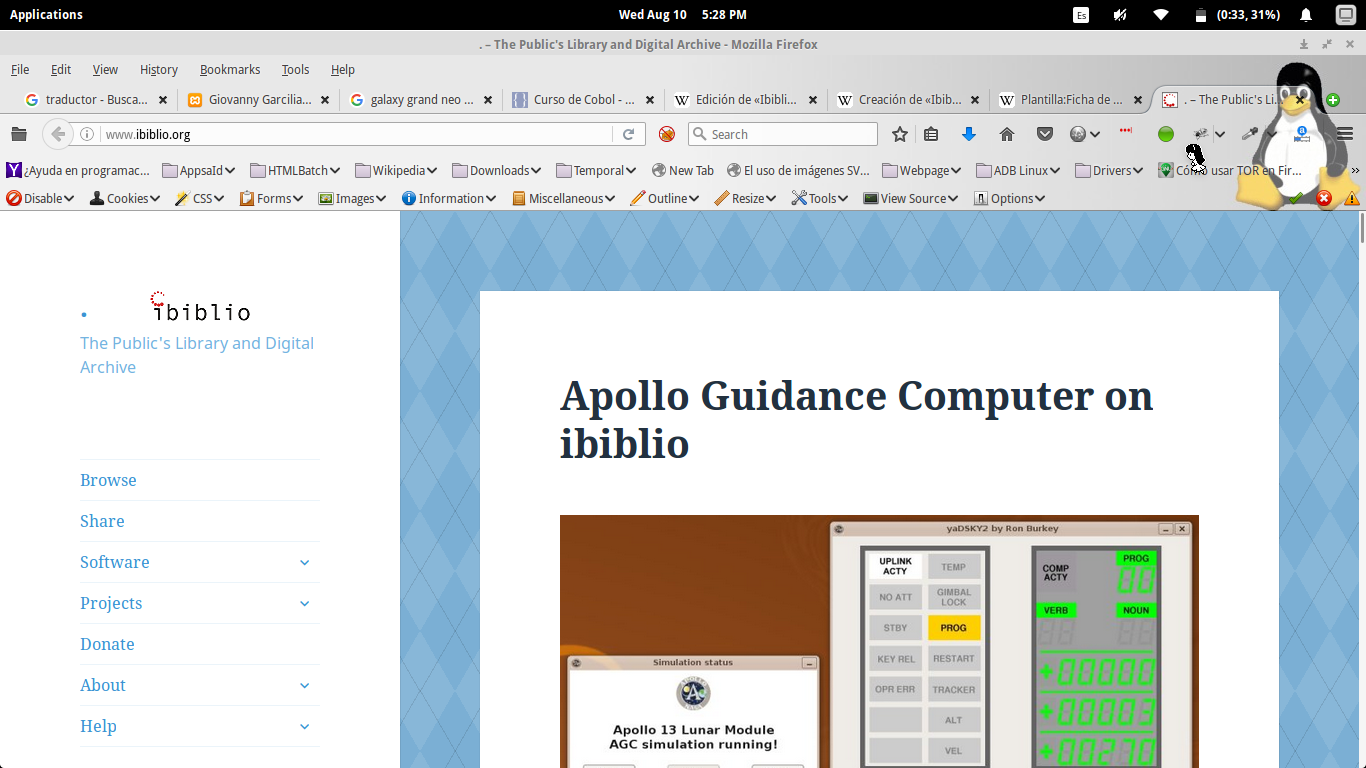
- ibiblio on Firefox 47
- Website type: Digital library and archive
- Available in: Multilingual, but predominately English
- Owner: University of North Carolina at Chapel Hill
- Creators: University of North Carolina at Chapel Hill and Sun Microsystems
- Website: ibiblio.org
- Commercial: No
- Registration: Optional
- Launched: c. 1992
- Current status: Online

ibiblio (formerly SunSITE.unc.edu and MetaLab.unc.edu) is a "collection of collections", and hosts a diverse range of publicly available information and open source content, including software, music, literature, art, history, science, politics, and cultural studies. As an "Internet librarianship", ibiblio is a digital library and archive project. It is run by the School of Information and Library Science and the School of Journalism and Mass Communication at the University of North Carolina at Chapel Hill, with partners including the Center for the Public Domain, IBM, and SourceForge. It also offers streaming audio radio stations. In November 1994 it started the first internet radio stream by rebroadcasting WXYC, the UNC student-run radio station. It also takes credit for the first non-commercial IPv6 / Internet2 radio stream. Unless otherwise specified, all material on ibiblio is assumed to be in the public domain.

ibiblio is a member of the Open Library and Open Content Alliance.

== History ==
In 1992, the University of North Carolina at Chapel Hill developed SunSITE.unc.edu, which was to be an archive and an information sharing project for the public. It was funded by grants from Sun Microsystems, and thus the name. The relationship with Sun came to an end (an amicable one, according to the ibiblio FAQ; the change in name was for a "vendor-neutral name that expressed what our project has evolved into over the years") and the name was changed to MetaLab. It collaborated with various sources, including academic institutions, corporations, and information technology entrepreneurs.

Also in 1992, sunsite.unc.edu became one of the first web sites on the internet. Today, it is still the host for a copy of the oldest web page known in history.

In September 2000, MetaLab began to collaborate with the Center for the Public Domain; the name was changed to ibiblio to reflect the goal of being "the public's library and digital archive".

	2002	2006	2008
Collections	800	1600+	2500+
Visits (ftp+www/day)	3 million	15+ million	16+ million
Data (terabytes)	1	8	13
Web servers	1 large, 2 peripherals	22 www/vhosts	25 www/vhost servers
Database servers	2	5	7
Radio stations	4	7	6

=== Currently supported projects ===
- Cafe au Lait (Hosted)
- Damn Small Linux (Hosts MyDSL)
- Degree Confluence Project (Hosted)
- Eric S Raymond (Hosted)
- etree (Hosted)
- FreeDOS (Files archive)
- Friends of Tibet (Hosted)
- GPGPU (General-Purpose Computation Using Graphics Hardware) (Hosted)
- Groklaw (Hosted)
- Linux Documentation Project (Began at MetaLab)
- Lyceum (ibiblio-run software research project)
- Openphoto.net (Hosted)
- Osprey (ibiblio-run software research project)
- Project Gutenberg (Hosted)
- Puppy Linux (repositories)
- Tempora Heroica (Hosted)
- Tiny Core Linux (Hosted)
- Videobloggers (Hosted)
- World Tibet Day (Hosted)
- Yggdrasil Linux (Historical archive)

=== Lists ===
- List of digital library projects

== See also ==
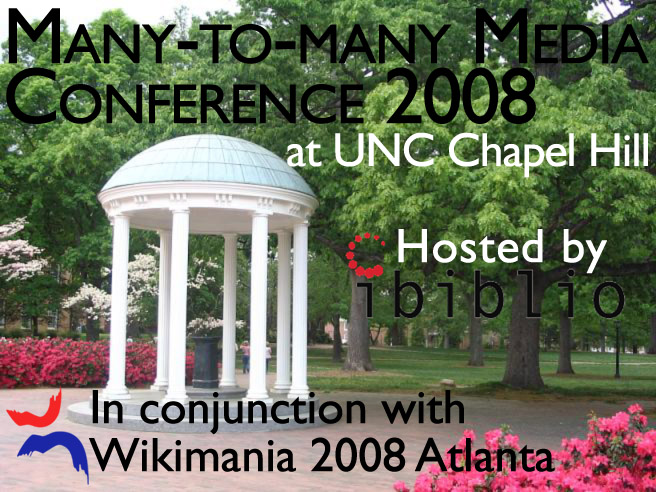
UNC WM ibiblio event in 2008

- Jointly Administered Knowledge Environment or jake (now defunct)
- Paul Jones (computer technologist)
- Sunsite
