= AskMoses.com =

Defunct Jewish knowledge website

Ask Moses
- Formation: 2000
- Director: Chaim Nochum Cunin
- Parent organization: Chabad West Coast Headquarters
- Affiliations: Chabad
- Website: www.askmoses.com

AskMoses.com was a website affiliated with the Chabad Orthodox Jewish movement. Via the site, users could query a database of Judaism-related topics or live chat with a rabbi. The site was a department of Chabad West Coast Headquarters, with Rabbi Chaim Nochum Cunin serving as its director.

The site's database included topics ranging from Israeli history to sexual mores from an Orthodox Jewish-perspective. Live chats were available in English, Russian, Spanish, French, and Hebrew. The website claimed in 2009 that 30% of visitors were non-Jewish, and most of the Jewish visitors were secular.

In 2001, the website featured 60 rabbis working 24 hours a day, six days a week. The rabbis did not work on Shabbat. The website's budget of $475,000 was funded by donations. In 2009, the site claimed to surpass one million live chats answered by its staff of approximately 45 Los Angeles-based scholars and educators.

As of 2021 the site is no longer active or accessible.

== See also ==
- Chabad.org
