= Metababy =

Metababy was a wiki created and coded by Greg Knauss and designed by Leslie Harpold, that allowed raw HTML, JavaScript and CSS in its pages. The wiki ran from November 1998 to May 2003.

Metababy would display the contents of every email sent to the address metababy@metababy.com.

It was nominated for a Webby Award in 2000.

The wiki died out due to the increasing number of spam and offensive posts. It was later resurrected, but was then shut down again. Since its shutdown, the site displays the static text "I think we could all probably use a rest."
