= Jointly Administered Knowledge Environment =

The Jointly Administered Knowledge Environment, or jake, was the first open source OpenURL link server. It was a free database created by Yale University. Jake contained metadata about periodicals, including which databases a periodical appeared in, and whether it was indexed, abstracted, or full-text. Additionally, "Jake contains descriptions of 162 of the widely subscribed-to databases, search interfaces and free standing electronic services. Specifications such as title lists, number of titles with citations, and number of titles with full text are given for database descriptions." Jake was used by Simon Fraser University to create their own electronic resource management solution. Despite its initial growth, by December 2006, jake was no longer being supported. As of July 14, 2009, the jake website now directs users to OCLC's WorldCat Link Manager (WCLM), an expensive subscription service that replicates what jake once offered for free. The corresponding OCLC WorldCat Link Manager site now as of at least February 26, 2012 indicates that it has been retired.
