= Chabad.org =

Website of Chabad Jewish movement

- Company type: Non-profit
- Available in: English; French; German; Hebrew; Italian; Portuguese; Russian; Spanish
- Founder: Yosef Yitzchak Kazen
- Website: chabad.org
- Launched: 1988; 38 years ago
- Current status: Active

Chabad.org is the flagship website of the Chabad-Lubavitch Hasidic movement. It was one of the first Jewish internet sites.

== History ==
In 1988, Yosef Yitzchak Kazen, a Chabad rabbi, began creating a Chabad-Lubavitch presence in cyberspace. With the advent of computer communication technology, Kazen recognized its potential for reaching an almost limitless audience, unlimited by geographic and other constraints. Kazen digitized thousands of documents into what became the world's first virtual Jewish library, and enabling thousands of people to learn about Judaism for the first time. Chabad.org served as a model for other Jewish organizations that created their own educational websites.

== Jewish knowledge base ==
Chabad.org has a Jewish knowledge base which includes over 100,000 articles of information ranging from basic Judaism to Hasidic philosophy taught from the Chabad point of view. The major categories are the human being, God and man, concepts and ideas, the Torah, the physical world, the Jewish calendar, science and technology, people and events. There are sections on Shabbat, Kosher, Tefillin, Mezuzah, the Jewish way in death and mourning and a synagogue companion.

== Ask the Rabbi ==
Chabad.org was the pioneer of "Ask the rabbi" sites. Kazen reached out to thousands of people on Fidonet, an online discussion network, as far back as 1988.

In 1994, Kazen launched the first version of Chabad's "Ask the Rabbi" website. Today's version, in which 40 rabbis and educators field questions via e-mail, answered more than 500,000 questions between 2001 and 2006, averaging about 270 a day. Many people take advantage of the Web's anonymity to impart experiences and ask for advice from chabad.org. Chabad.org also operates TheJewishWoman.org's "Dear Rachel", a similar service which is run by women for women. Questions and answers have been posted online.

== Features ==
Chabad.org provides daily, date-specific information relevant to each day from Jewish history, daily Torah study, candle-lighting times, and forthcoming Jewish holidays.

Chabad.org maintains a number of sub-sites, including

- Weekly Magazine email on Torah and contemporary life.
- A search feature that enables the user to quickly find a Chabad House in any part of the world.
- An online Jewish library that contains some 100,000 articles.
- An "Ask the Rabbi" feature.
- A multimedia portal, Jewish.tv, where users can stream Jewish audio and video.
- A children's section.
- A section featuring reports in the media on the activities of Chabad Lubavitch Shluchim ("emissaries").

Chabad.org and its affiliated sites claim over 43 million visitors per year, and over 365,000 email subscribers.

== See also ==
- AskMoses.com
- Tzvi Freeman
- Internet activism
- Internet marketing
- Kikar HaShabbat (website)

== Sources ==
- Rabbi Schneerson's life for a history-gathering project
- Let my people download! Passover texts available online
