= Maggie Mason =

American writer

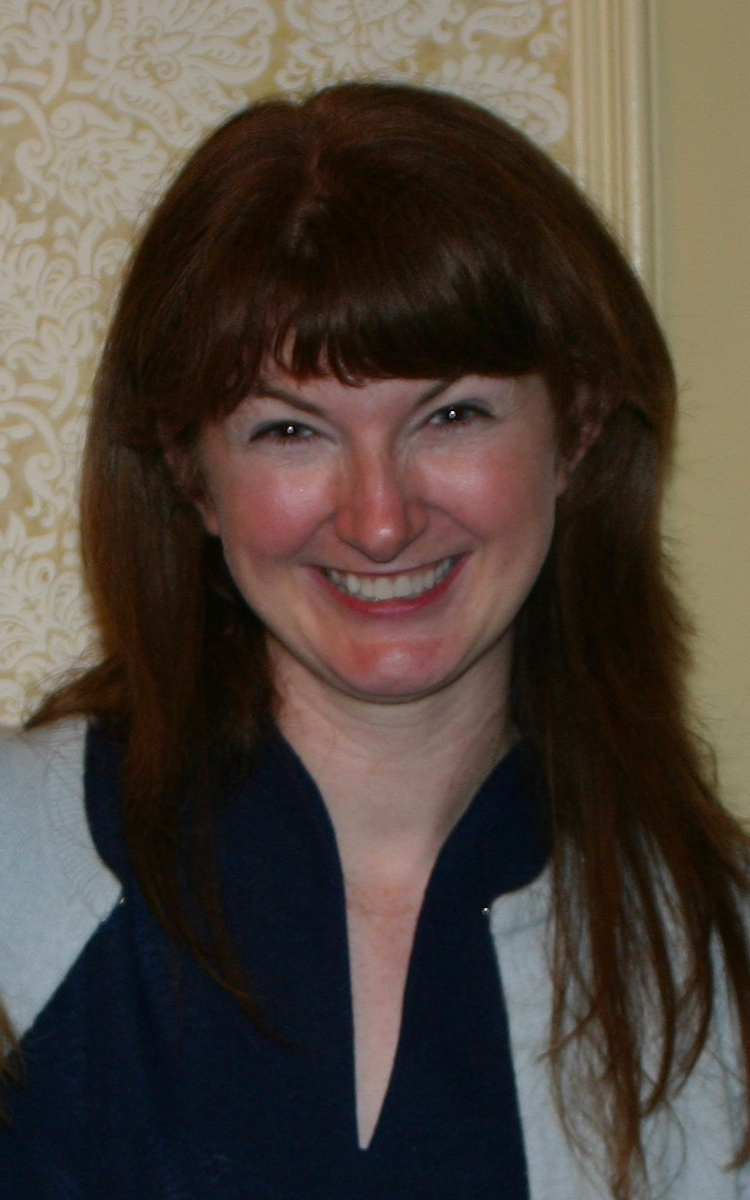
Mason in 2008

Margaret Mason (née Margaret Berry, 1975) is an American author and the creator of the website Mighty Girl. She is also the creator of three shopping blogs, Mighty Goods, Mighty Haus, and Mighty Junior, which were acquired by Staircase Ventures in 2010.

Mason is co-founder of Mighty Events, which hosted two annual conferences, Camp Mighty and Mighty Summit.

Mason is author of No One Cares What You Had for Lunch: 100 Ideas for Your Blog, which provided tips for what people should include in their person blog. She had a "Life List" project on her blog, with personal goals that she wrote about, such as tasting 1,000 kinds of fruit. She is a two-time The Weblog Awards (Bloggie) nominee for lifetime achievement. She has been a speaker at the SxSW, Mom 2.0, the ALT Design Conference, and BlogHer conferences. She was a member of Intel's social media advisory board, and her work has appeared in NPR's Morning Edition Sunday, The New York Times, Elle Magazine, Bon Appetit, and The Kitchn.

She started the group blog Go Mighty, and was a fashion writer for The Morning News.

Mason lives in San Francisco.

== Books and publications ==
- No One Cares What You Had for Lunch: 100 Ideas for Your Blog (author; Peachpit Press)
- Cringe: Teenage Diaries, Journals, Notes, Letters, Poems, and Abandoned Rock Operas (contributor)
- Things I Learned About My Dad: Humorous and Heartfelt Essays (contributor)
