= Yosef Yitzchak Kazen =

- Born: Yosef Yitzchak Kazen; 1954; Cleveland, Ohio, US
- Died: 1 Dec 1998 (aged 44); Brooklyn, New York City, US
- Known for: Creating Chabad.org
- Spouse: Rochel Kazen
- Children: Raizy, Michoel, Shmuel, Choni, Peretz and Sarah

Yosef Yitzchak Kazen (1954 – 1 December 1998), also known as Y.Y. Kazen, was an American Chabad-Lubavitch Hasidic rabbi.

== Early life ==
Kazen was born in Cleveland, Ohio to Rabbi Zalman and Shula Kazen. After arriving in Brooklyn, New York from the Soviet Union, the Kazens moved to Cleveland after being encouraged to do so by the Lubavitcher Rebbe. As a child, Kazen went to the Cleveland Kaliver Yeshivah and the Hebrew Academy and studied after school with his father. He also studied in New York and Brazil. He attended high school at the Telshe ("Telz") Talmudic Academy in Cleveland and later attended the Central Lubavitch Yeshivah.

== Chabad.org ==
In 1988, Kazen was inspired to use bulletin board systems to aid in Chabad's outreach after discovering Fidonet, an online discussion network distributed across several thousand nodes worldwide. He received the Lubavitcher Rebbe's approval and started working on Chabad.org on his home computer. Kazen worked from his basement answering emails and later running the website. He was later given an office at Lubavitch Headquarters.

Kazen answered emails as part of "Ask the Rabbi" since 1988, making it the longest running online "Ask the Rabbi" service. He also started to digitize Jewish texts and post them on Fidonet bulletin boards.

After taking programming classes, Kazen started to develop a website, initially called Chabad-Lubavitch in Cyberspace, with the assistance of the Dorsai Embassy, which was launched on the World Wide Web in 1993. In February 1994, Dorsai helped Kazen register the Chabad.org domain name and set up the web servers at the Lubavitch World Headquarters. Kazen's outreach included organizing a Passover service on a boat near Antarctica, sending kosher recipes to Jews worldwide, making thousands of Jewish documents and texts available online and using the site to answer e-mails and frequently asked questions as part of "Ask the Rabbi".

Kazen was featured in the 24 Hours in Cyberspace photographic exhibition at the Smithsonian's National Museum of American History.

Even after being diagnosed with lymphoma in 1998, Kazen continued to answer e-mails and update Chabad.org using a laptop in the hospital. Kazen died on 1 December and was buried in the Lubavitch section of the Old Montefiore Cemetery in Queens, New York near the Lubavitcher Rebbe and the Frierdiker Rebbe.

As of 2013, 488,431 people worldwide are subscribed to Chabad.org's emails, the site has 25 "Ask the Rabbi" responders, 744,370 questions answered in the past decade, content from 1,890 authors, hundreds of kosher recipes and thousands of video and audio files.

== Family ==
Kazen married Rochel. Together, they had six children: Raizy, Michoel, Shmuel, Choni, Peretz and Sarah.
