= Zombo.com =

Single-serving website

- The original Flash version of Zombo.com
- Website type: Web animation: Flash (1999–2021); HTML5 (2021–current)
- Available in: English
- Website: zombo.com at the Wayback Machine (archived 1999-11-28)
- Launched: 10 October 1999; 27 years ago
- Current status: Online (as a website)

Zombo.com was a single-serving site created in 1999 by Joshua Levine. The site parodies Flash introductory web pages that play while the rest of a site's content loads. Zombo took the concept to a humorous extreme, consisting of one long introductory page that leads to an invitation to sign up for a newsletter.

The site was initially a Flash animation, but it switched to HTML5 due to the discontinuation of Adobe Flash Player on December 1st, 2020. On February 7, 2026, the website was purchased at GoDaddy and was completely redesigned over the following 2 days.

== Creation ==
The domain Zombo.com was registered on October 10, 1999 by Joshua Levine. Levine stated in 2001 that the word "Zombo" meant a male zombie, as a friend of his learned in her English class. Levine also said when it was time to name the site, the word "just sort of popped up."

== Content ==
Originally, Zombo.com consisted of a "blank" page, a colorful title, and a throbber animation of seven colorful quickly-rotating round, circular discs, making them appear as if they were pulsating. The website also contained an audio clip of a man welcoming the visitor to Zombo.com (pronounced as “Zombocom”), with the promise of a place where "everything is possible".

After some time, the option to sign up for a "newZletter" appeared, parodying the concept of online newsletters. It was a continuation of the joke as it was a short link to http://www.zombo.com/join1.htm, which told the reader that this particular option was not available yet. This message was conveyed as a humorously written thank you in the same register form of "newZletter," stating, "ThankZ for your patience." The website's HTML markup also contained the comment "Please Visit http://www.15footstick.com our other website ThankZ", which led to a website containing various art and music, as well as a page selling Zombo.com T-shirts. Since then, the website has gone down for maintenance.

In the HTML5 version, the audio clip loops to the start when it ends, removing the "newZletter" message. The HTML markup comment was also removed. Additionally, the discs in the center spin at a smoother frame rate, making them look less like they change color.

The current version of Zombo.com

On February 7, 2026, the domain was changed to redirect to a website listing Zombo.com as up for sale by GoDaddy. The redirect was quickly removed, but a series of changes were made to the website over the next few days, completely redesigning the banner, audio, and UI. On February 9, the most recent change was made, which added text at the bottom of the website welcoming the user to "New Management" and stating that the new owner was interested in purchasing the rights for the original content of Zombo.com from its owners. Since then, several fan-made websites have emerged, aiming to recreate the content of the original Zombo.com.

== Popularity ==
Video game producer Bill Roper and artist Dave Rowntree have each listed Zombo as their favorite website; Rowntree explains, "I think [zombo.com] paraphrases the [inter]net. Promises you the earth [sic] but delivers a bit of animation with a scratchy soundtrack!" Web animator Joel Veitch chose Zombo.com as the least useful website since "it doesn't do anything except tell you how wonderful it is." Ian McClelland, currently managing director of Guardian Australia, but at the time Senior Producer for Cartoon Network, also cited Zombo.com as the least useful site in the same column two years previously "Utterly useless, absolutely brilliant". Mark Sullivan of PC World listed Zombo among the Internet's ten most useless websites, concluding, "Well, in fact, nothing happens at zombo.com." In 2004 Samela Harris of The Advertiser called Zombo.com "the most welcoming website on the Internet", and in 2007 Daryl Lim of Digital Life called Zombo.com "the ultimate time-waster". A listing in The Australian writes, "Zombo.com has just one joke, but it's a good one." Zombo.com was also featured on Neal.fun's Internet Artifacts.

On 4 September 2013, Matthew Inman, creator of the webcomic The Oatmeal, listed Zombo.com as his favorite website in an interview with Runner's World.

On 23 January 2020, Terry Cavanagh, programmer of VVVVVV and Super Hexagon, created a VR version of Zombo.com.
