= Paul Cormier (engineer) =

American business executive

Paul J. Cormier
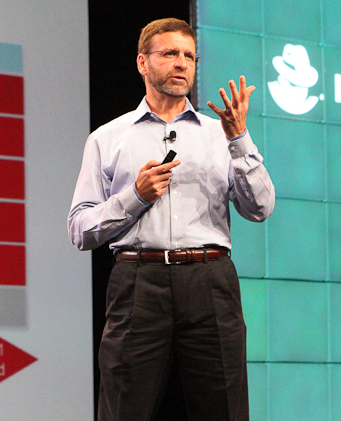
- Education: Fitchburg State University (BS); Rochester Institute of Technology (MBA)
- Title: Chairman, Red Hat

Paul J. Cormier is a business executive and chairman of Red Hat. He previously was chief executive officer (CEO) from April 2020 to July 2022.

== Early life and education ==
Cormier was born in Fitchburg on November 4, 1959. His interest in computers started during his high school years when his father got him a summer job in Digital Equipment Corporation where he kept working until his college years. He attended the Fitchburg State University and did his master's degree at Rochester Institute of Technology. After graduation, he participated in Graduate Engineering Education Program of IBM and Digital.

== Career at Red Hat ==
Cormier joined Red Hat in May 2001 as Executive Vice President of Engineering and initiated the commercialization of open source products by promoting cloud services. He also helped the creation of Red Hat Enterprise Linux.

Cormier was appointed CEO of Red Hat on 6 April 2020, replacing Jim Whitehurst. He was replaced by Matt Hicks on 12 July 2022 and became chairman of the company.

Cormier retired on April 1, 2024, after 24 years with Red Hat.

Business positions
| Preceded by Jim Whitehurst | President and CEO of Red Hat; April 6, 2020 – July 12, 2022 | Succeeded by Matt Hicks |
