= The Useless Pages =

Humorous website founded in 1994

The Useless Pages was an example of early beta web humor.

== Criteria ==
It was a list of links to web pages the writers deemed egregiously useless, with humorous descriptions. In time it grew to a directory with links archived by category. It helped disseminate many early minor internet memes and phenomenon. There were many imitators, and it spawned its own Yahoo category. Marc Andreessen once called it "One of the best sites on the Web".

== Origins ==
The site was founded by Paul Phillips in 1994. Steve Berlin took over in 1995 and started to update more regularly. In 1999 John Gephart IV took over and continued to update the site until early 2001.

== Reception ==
The Useless Web received media coverage in The New York Times and Wired magazine.

== Similar websites ==
A similar website, The Useless Web, was launched in 2012.

== See also ==
- Mirsky's Worst of the Web
