= Purple.com =

1994 single-page website

- Screenshot of the purple background on Purple.com.
- Creator: Jeff Abrahamson
- Launched: August 31, 1994; 32 years ago
- Current status: Purple Comfort now owns Purple.com

Purple.com, commonly referred to as "Purple", was a single-page website created in 1994. It consisted of no links or text and its only content was a purple background. The site also linked to the owner, Jeff Abrahamson, at purple.com/Jeff and Jeff.purple.com; his dog, Misha, at purple.com/misha, a site with instructions to contact Jeff if Misha was lost and found; as well as his rental property business in Philadelphia, Pennsylvania, where he owned multiple properties for rent. The site was used for many purposes, both commercial and personal, over the years by Abrahamson. The site is notable as being the oldest known single-serving site. As of November 2017 purple.com no longer displays its older content of a plain purple background, but now serves as the domain for a mattress company by the name of Purple.

== Content ==
The most noticeable feature of the site was the main page with a purple-coloured background. The site later added subpages, including FAQs, a notification about abuse and spam, a guideline about linking the site, and guidelines on availability.

== History ==
According to the creator, software engineer Jeff Abrahamson, the site originated from the difficult process of accessing and surfing the internet in its early days, similar to most early single-serving sites. Over the years from 1994 through 2017, when Abrahamson sold the site, he used it for many purposes: novel, personal, and commercial, as stated above.

The site was launched on 31 August 1994. From its launch to late 2006 the background colour was #DD00FF , resulting in numerous complaints that it was not actually purple. It was changed to #7D26CD on 6 November 2006 based on recommendations.

In November 2017, the domain name was sold to bedding and mattress producer Purple Innovation LLC for approximately $900k. As of June 2020, Abrahamson has hosted a similarly minimal website as a memorial, ISoldPurple.com.

== Impact ==
Some sites have been created as parodies of the site. Some of the most well known, both created in 2007 are SometimesRedSometimesBlue.com, created by Damon Zucconi which randomly has either a red and blue background and LetsTurnThisFuckingWebsiteYellow.com, a site which consists of a yellow background created by Charles Broskoski. Randomcolour.com and notpurple.com are websites that generate a different background colour (chosen at random) when visited.

The home page's minimal data size, obvious visual appearance, and unlikelihood of being already cached on a user's browser made it a go-to page for IT support workers to verify internet connectivity or force a redirect to a public internet login page.

In January 2018, theoldpurple.com was created as an homage to and replacement for the original, single-page Purple website, however it also went defunct as of March 2025.
