= Center for the Public Domain =

Defunct nonprofit organization

The Center for the Public Domain was a charitable foundation created in 1999 by Bob Young as the Red Hat Center for Open Source. Until 2002, it provided free online legal resources, sponsored public domain spaces on the Internet, and campaigned for copyright reforms.

The Center dissolved itself in March 2002, after distributing about $12 million in grants, primarily to four organizations: ibiblio, Public Knowledge, Creative Commons, and the Center for the Study of the Public Domain at the Duke University School of Law.
