= Automatic Complaint-Letter Generator =

Website that creates complaint letters

- Available in: English
- Owner: Scott Pakin
- Website: https://www.pakin.org/complaint
- Launched: 1994
- Current status: Active

The Automatic Complaint-Letter Generator is a website that automatically generates complaint letters. The website was created by Scott Pakin in 1994.

It allows users to submit the name of the individual or company that the complaint is directed toward. The program then generates a complaint letter that is "general enough to be true or fit anyone and everyone, yet specific enough to mean something".

== History ==
Scott Pakin started the website in April 1994. While he was an undergraduate student studying computer science at Carnegie Mellon University, he began thinking of creating a program that would generate complaint letters. The idea originated after he looked through "pointless ramblings" in a student newspaper. Pakin criticized the letters' quality. One of his friends remarked that the letters sounded so arbitrary that a computer could have written them. Pakin pondered over this comment and decided to write a program that would generate complaints.

== Usage ==
The website generates exclusively complaint letters. It allows users to specify the name of the individual or company that the complaint is directed toward, as well as the number of paragraphs the complaint will be. After submitting the data, the computer generates sentences that are composed of arbitrary verbs, nouns, and adjectives.

In 1995, the generator had "282 sentence skeletons, 170 independent clauses, 183 adjectives, and 123 nouns". The combination of these elements can form more than one billion sentences. As of September 2009, the generator has expanded to 3379 independent clauses, 618 adjectives, and 497 nouns. The complaint letters are randomly generated, so each insult is different.

Pakin said that people who read the letters were inclined to pay attention to the sentences that were accurate about them but ignored the statements that were obviously wrong. He noted that the complaint generator is "general enough to be true or fit anyone and everyone, yet specific enough to mean something".

== 2001 incident ==
In 2001, Paul Weyland was chosen by his Austin Toastmasters club to present Kirk Watson, the mayor of Austin, Texas at a gathering. When a Toastmasters member asked Weyland about his speech, he went to the Automatic Complaint-Letter Generator and typed in the mayor's name. After the generator churned out a four-page complaint letter, Weyland accidentally emailed it to the mayor, even though he meant to send it to his fellow Toastmaster member as a joke.

Watson learned about the joke and indicated that he would not be attending the club meeting because of "security issues". Then, his aide e-mailed Weyland and said the mayor was just joking. At the meeting, Weyland apologized to the mayor in a "fawning introductory speech". The mayor then responded: "[y]ou know, in Paul's rant, he accused me of having my lips planted to the posteriors of drug-addled sycophants. If you'll notice, Paul's lips have been attached to my posterior all evening."

== Reception ==
The Chicago Tribune's Lynn Voedisch said the website was "eerily useful" in that "it seems to know what you're thinking". She inputted the name of Kenn Starr, the special prosecutor who investigated the Whitewater controversy, and the generator returned "this sterling sentence": "I undeniably find his fondness for inquisitions, witch hunts, star chambers and kangaroo courts most mad." Voedisch concluded, "Prescient? You be the judge." Praising the website in The Washington Post, Victorian Shannon wrote, "You don't know how to rant and rave about someone until you've seen the Automatic Complaint-Letter Generator, an oldie but goodie on the Web."

The author Dan Crowley criticized the website for creating a "long and rambling string of gibberish that sounds impressive, but really doesn't say much". He wrote, "a hick would write a better letter suited to the specific situation than this letter generator does. This site takes a kind of stupid but funny concept and makes it just plain stupid."
