= Justin Mason =

Irish open-source software developer

- Born: Ireland
- Occupation: Software engineer
- Known for: Apache SpamAssassin
- Website: https://jmason.org

Justin Mason is an Irish software developer who is known for his work on Apache SpamAssassin and other open-source software.

== Career ==
Mason began a degree in mathematics in 1989 in Trinity College Dublin. In 1991 he became the first employee at IONA Technologies. As part of his work at IONA, Mason established the LPRng mailing list and collaborated on the development of LPRng for a period.

In 1993, Mason set up a web server in IONA, the first web server outside academia in Ireland. Initially, the site just included pages for his own use, but with Colin Newman they put together web pages for the company and its object request broker.

In 1999, Mason moved to Netnote International, an Irish company developing a low-cost device for internet access.

Mason had been maintaining a number of patches against an anti-spam program named filter.plx by Mark Jeftovic. This led to Mason creating SpamAssassin, taking inspiration from Jeftovic's code, and uploading the result to SourceForge in April 2001. Mason moved to work at DeerSoft, a company founded by Craig Hughes to provide a Windows version of SpamAssassin. In 2002 DeerSoft was acquired by NAI and became part of McAfee's enterprise anti-spam team.

In 2004, the SpamAssassin project became an Apache Software Foundation project, with Mason becoming one of the Project Management Committee members and acting as vice president for the SpamAssassin PMC between 2006 and 2008.

Mason served as a technical advisory board member for MailChannels.

Mason continued to contribute to the Apache Software Foundation and SpamAssassin for a number of years. More recently, Mason has worked at companies including Amazon and Swrve developing cloud deployment, logging and monitoring tools, including RateLimitedLogger, SLF4J-compatible rate-limited logging API for Java.

== Other activities ==
Mason acted as a technical officer to the original IrelandOffline committee and maintained the Irish Internet Users mailing list. He has bloged since 2001 and previously maintained a list of the top 100 Irish Blogs based on Technorati's data.

In addition to SpamAssassin, Mason has developed several open source projects, including a number of CPAN packages and gif320, an image viewer for VT320 terminals. He has contributed to other projects, such as the bbPress plugin for WordPress.
