= The Nine Planets =

Website

The Nine Planets is a multimedia website by Bill Arnett containing information about the Solar System. It was one of the first examples of a multimedia website when it first appeared on the World Wide Web in 1994 and, as was common for high traffic websites at the time, it was widely mirrored. It contains encyclopedic information about the Solar System with a page for each of the major bodies illustrated with photographs, mostly from NASA.

== Awards ==
The site's numerous awards include:

- 1995 PC Magazine's Top 100 websites
- 2002 Scientific American's Sci/Tech web award for astronomy and astrophysics
