= Fishcam =

Series of broadcasts of fish tanks

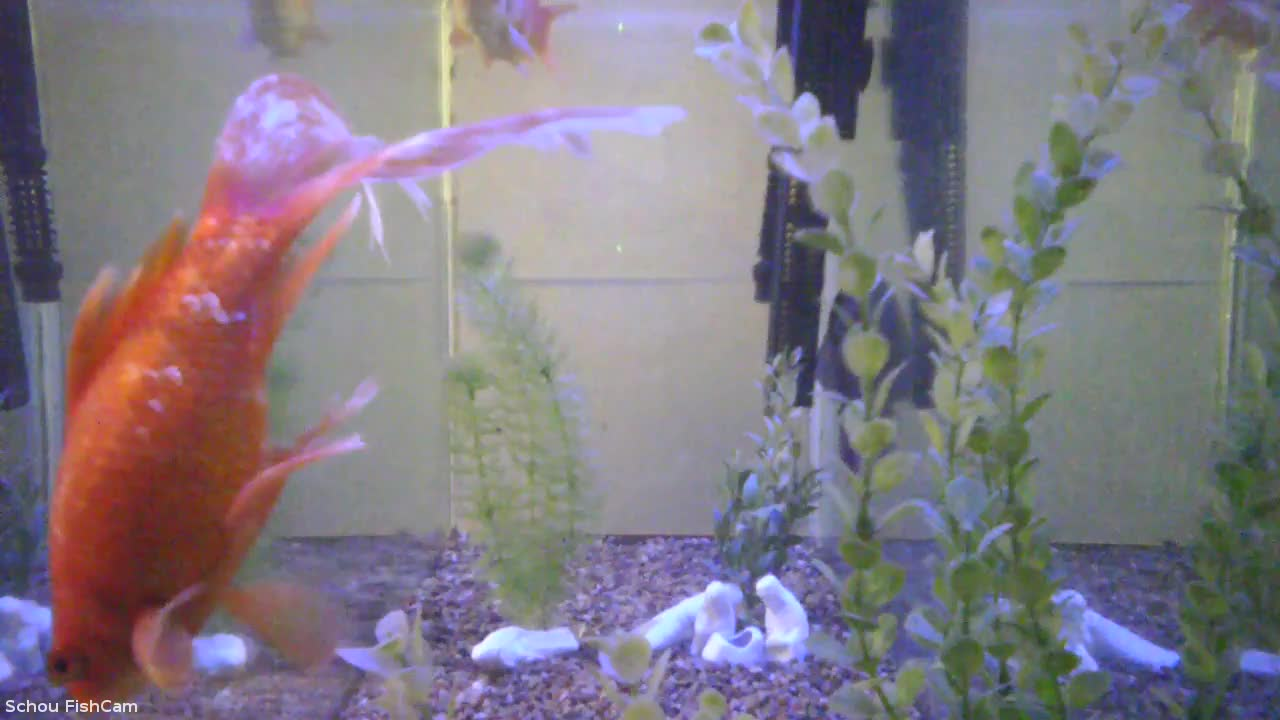
Schou FishCam

Fishcam refers to a broadcast consisting of a video camera pointed at a fish tank.

== Australia ==
Channel 31 Melbourne, Australia was known for one of the more famous and long-lasting fishcams. The fishcam itself was originally used as a replacement for the more common testcards shown when the station had nothing else to air. Due to extreme popularity, FishCam became a scheduled show on the community television network. The station has also released several VHS tapes of the programme. The broadcast was accompanied by the music of unsigned Melbourne musicians.

Rumours have abounded amongst fans that Channel 31 has played repeats of this programme while it has continued to be labelled "live".

On its debut in 1994, FishCam aired from 11:30pm to 8am weekdays and all weekend, but by 2007 only aired between 3am and 5am. On 4 March 2007, FishCam was cancelled, with Channel 31 management citing growth in its original community programming as a reason for the cancellation, with a statement adding, "Melbourne's insomniac community deserves quality programming in the middle of the night."

On 13 October 2014 FishCam returned at the new time of 9 pm hosted by Luis from Lessons with Luis. It ran for 11 episodes, ending on 22 December 2014, when the fish tank was broken during the final episode.

== Canada ==
When St. John's television station NTV first commenced 24-hour broadcasting in the early 1970s, one of its overnight programmes was a continuous shot of a fish tank.

Bell and cable provider Rogers both have Aquarium channels

== Denmark ==
DR TV used an aquarium as an interlude between 1981 and 1985, during long breaks between programming, with a camera recording the TV-Byen aquarium. The interlude was known as Pause-fisk.

== Germany ==
In 1992 when Ostdeutscher Rundfunk Brandenburg (ORB) launched, ORB Aquarium was among the original programmes, consisting of a 30-minute loop of Fish. Music was provided by Radio Brandenburg (now rbb radioeins). In September 1992, the show recurved 10,000 viewers and a 37.5% market share, the highest value in the history of ORB. That led to similar programmes such as Space Night, first shown on Bayerischer Rundfunk in 1994, which is currently shown on ARD-alpha & Germany's Most Beautiful Railways aired on ARD between 1995 & 2013. ORB Aquarium was discontinued in 2004.

== Hong Kong ==
The ATV Network in Hong Kong also aired a Fishcam programme, in lieu of test card after the station signs off the air. The programme's name was Telefishion (Chinese: 魚樂無窮). It became an unexpected hit for the station, with the programme performing as well as, if not better than, the station's normal primetime programmes. The title of the show entered into popular vocabulary as one being incredibly bored.

== Norway ==
The Norwegian public broadcaster NRK first aired a Fishcam-style programme called pausefiskene (pause-fishes) in black-and-white in 1965, converting to colour in the 1970s.

== Turkey ==
Turkish broadcaster Digiturk broadcasts live fish tanks on their music channels under the name "Aquavision".

== Turkmenistan ==
The state run youth channel Yaşlyk broadcasts a digital fish tank with the same piece of classical music playing on a loop after ending their daily transmissions until 6:55 am.

== Netscape ==
Netscape had a web feed of their fish tank, and for some time had an easter egg hidden in Netscape Communicator that would bring that page up when a user pressed CTRL + ALT + F. The Netscape Fishcam was the 2nd live camera to start broadcasting on the Web. The Netscape Fishcam went offline in the summer of 2007 and has been moved to a new site with a new tank housed in the offices of Zetta, Inc. by its original creator, Lou Montulli. The Fishcam easter egg was present in Mozilla Firefox until 15 February 2009 and remains in SeaMonkey.

== Similar events ==
- Yule Log, which broadcast on WPIX on Christmas night
- Orchestra (unofficial name), which broadcast on TV11 Thailand during downtime

== See also ==
- Yule Log (TV program)
- Lavarand
