= Ask the rabbi =

Jewish phrase

Ask the Rabbi is a term used in Jewish newspapers and on Jewish websites for responsa, known as Shut (Hebrew: שו"ת, literally Q&A), the traditional term for correspondence with rabbis, usually on a Halachic basis. This phrase is often used in casual conversation in Hebrew pop culture.

== Background and development ==
"Ask the Rabbi" is often used as an internet term for responsa: questions sent to rabbis and the answers received. The term became widespread on Jewish websites in the early 2000s.

== Responsa in Judaism ==
Jewish religious literature contains thousands of books of responsa also known as Shut in Hebrew, which started during the time of the Geonim and are popular to this day. The questions range over many topics, mostly about Jewish law (Halacha), but also requests for an explanation of a Talmudic issue or Jewish thought. The answers may be short or long and very detailed. A large part of the correspondence is from rabbis, or community leaders, sending an important question to a great rabbi. Naturally, the questions asked in the past did not demand an immediate and urgent answer.

The internet hosts several websites that feature rabbis answering questions received by email, or SMS. The majority of online questions come from the general public, Jewish and non-Jewish, and cover many topics. The anonymity of the Internet allows for intimate questions they individuals may be too embarrassed to ask face to face. This way of answering is so popular, that some articles are based on them.

== Comments and criticism ==
There has been some opposition to this phenomenon. The main criticism being the replacement of face-to-face communication by a virtual medium and the "instant" answers received to the questions. Judaism teaches the importance of study and work in order to gain knowledge, and it is claimed that the ease of asking via the Internet might promote disrespect towards the value of knowledge.
