= Sunsite =

Network of internet servers

SunSITE (Sun Software, Information & Technology Exchange) is a network of Internet servers providing archives of information, software and other publicly available resources. The project, started in the early 1990s, is run by a number of universities worldwide and was initially co-sponsored by Sun Microsystems.

The more notable SunSITEs include:

- SunSITE Canada, operated by University of British Columbia
- SunSITE Central Europe, operated by RWTH Aachen, Germany
  - Sun SITE Central Europe Workshop Proceedings (CEUR-WS.org) Free Open-Access
- SunSITE Poland, operated by ICM, University of Warsaw

Some former SunSITEs:

- SunSITE Chile
- SunSITE Denmark, now running as dotsrc.org Open Source Hosting
- SunSITE Mexico = Blank Page - 2022.04.28
- SunSITE North Carolina, operated by University of North Carolina at Chapel Hill, now running as Ibiblio
- SunSITE Singapore, operated by National University of Singapore = Blank Page - 2022.04.28
- SunSITE Switzerland, operated by SWITCH Information Technology Services, now running as SWITCHmirror
- University of Alberta SunSITE, now running as the University of Alberta Digital Object Repository (UADORe)

No longer in operation:

- SunSITE Austria, operated by University of Vienna
- SunSITE Argentina, operated by Universidad de Buenos Aires.
- Berkeley Digital Library SunSITE, University of California, Berkeley Libraries
- SunSITE Czech Republic, operated by School of Computer Science, Charles University, Prague = Server Not Found - 2022.04.28
- SunSITE Hungary, run by Institute of Mathematics, University of Debrecen
- SunSITE Indonesia, operated by Faculty of Computer Science, University of Indonesia, Jakarta
- SunSITE Japan
- SunSITE RedIris (Spain), operated by Spanish National Research Network = Server Not Found - 2022.04.28
- SunSITE South Africa, operated by University of Witwatersrand, Johannesburg
- SunSITE Tennessee operated by University of Tennessee, Knoxville = Server Not Found - 2022.04.28
- SunSITE Thailand operated by Assumption University, Bangkok = Server Not Found - 2022.04.28
- SunSITE UK, operated by Imperial College Department of Computing.
