= Trinity Journal (webzine) =

Trincoll Journal
- Founding Editor-in-Chief: Peter Adams
- Frequency: Monthly
- Format: World Wide Web
- Founder: Peter Adams, Paul Tedesco, Tom Eilia
- Founded: 1992
- First issue: May 1, 1992; 33 years ago
- Final issue: May 2000
- Country: USA
- Language: English
- Website: www.trincoll.edu/zines/tj

The Trincoll Journal (Trincoll Journal) is a WebZine. It was produced by a student group at Trinity College in Hartford, Connecticut, United States from 1992 until it became defunct in the spring of 2000. Most of its content is still available via the Trinity College website.

Widely cited as one of the first web based magazines, the Trincoll Journal began published on the web in November 1993. Prior to 1993 the Journal was published in Hypercard format and distributed via FTP archives.

== Founders ==
- Peter Adams
- Paul Tedesco
- Tom Elia

== Former Staff ==
- Frank Sikernitsky
