= Lou Montulli =

American computer programmer

- Born: Louis J. Montulli II
- Education: University of Kansas
- Occupation: Computer programmer

Louis J. Montulli II (best known as Lou Montulli) is a computer programmer who is well known for his work in producing web browsers. In 1991 and 1992, he co-authored a text web browser called Lynx, with Michael Grobe and Charles Rezac, while he was at the University of Kansas. This web browser was one of the first available and is still actively maintained and in use today.

== Career ==
In 1994, he became a founding engineer of Netscape Communications and programmed the networking code for the first versions of the Netscape web browser. He was also responsible for several browser innovations, such as HTTP cookies, the blink element, server push and client pull, HTTP proxying, and encouraging the implementation of animated GIFs into the browser. While at Netscape, he also was a founding member of the HTML working group at the W3C and was a contributing author of the HTML 3.2 specification. He is one of only six inductees in the World Wide Web Hall of Fame announced at the First International Conference on the World-Wide Web in 1994.

In 1998, he became a founding engineer of Epinions which is now a Shopping.com company.

In 2002, he was named to the MIT Technology Review TR100 as one of the top 100 innovators in the world under the age of 35.

In 2004, he became co-founder and CEO of Memory Matrix, which was acquired by Shutterfly Inc. in May 2005. Montulli served as Vice President of Client Engineering at Shutterfly through the summer of 2007.

In 2008, he became co-founder of Zetta.net, a cloud storage company.

In 2015, he joined JetInsight as co-founder and CTO.

In 2022, he was recognized among Hidden Heroes for his significant technology contribution, including the HTTP cookie and Lynx.

== Ongoing projects ==
While working on the Netscape browser, Montulli built the Fishcam, one of the earliest live image websites (i.e. live as in broadcasting), famously built into early versions of the Netscape browser as the Fishcam Easter egg. The company Netscape hosted this fishcam until long after they were no longer Netscape. After a short hiatus, in 2009 it found a new host; it is still one of the longest (nearly) continuously running live websites.

== See also ==
- List of programmers
